

157001–157100 

|-bgcolor=#E9E9E9
| 157001 ||  || — || July 24, 2003 || Palomar || NEAT || — || align=right | 3.7 km || 
|-id=002 bgcolor=#d6d6d6
| 157002 ||  || — || July 24, 2003 || Palomar || NEAT || — || align=right | 4.3 km || 
|-id=003 bgcolor=#d6d6d6
| 157003 ||  || — || July 24, 2003 || Palomar || NEAT || — || align=right | 3.5 km || 
|-id=004 bgcolor=#E9E9E9
| 157004 ||  || — || July 25, 2003 || Socorro || LINEAR || — || align=right | 4.1 km || 
|-id=005 bgcolor=#E9E9E9
| 157005 ||  || — || August 3, 2003 || Haleakala || NEAT || — || align=right | 2.2 km || 
|-id=006 bgcolor=#d6d6d6
| 157006 ||  || — || August 19, 2003 || Campo Imperatore || CINEOS || — || align=right | 4.9 km || 
|-id=007 bgcolor=#d6d6d6
| 157007 ||  || — || August 20, 2003 || Campo Imperatore || CINEOS || — || align=right | 4.3 km || 
|-id=008 bgcolor=#d6d6d6
| 157008 ||  || — || August 21, 2003 || Haleakala || NEAT || — || align=right | 5.3 km || 
|-id=009 bgcolor=#d6d6d6
| 157009 ||  || — || August 22, 2003 || Socorro || LINEAR || HYG || align=right | 4.7 km || 
|-id=010 bgcolor=#d6d6d6
| 157010 ||  || — || August 21, 2003 || Campo Imperatore || CINEOS || — || align=right | 4.0 km || 
|-id=011 bgcolor=#d6d6d6
| 157011 ||  || — || August 22, 2003 || Socorro || LINEAR || EOS || align=right | 3.7 km || 
|-id=012 bgcolor=#d6d6d6
| 157012 ||  || — || August 22, 2003 || Socorro || LINEAR || THM || align=right | 3.9 km || 
|-id=013 bgcolor=#d6d6d6
| 157013 ||  || — || August 22, 2003 || Socorro || LINEAR || — || align=right | 4.8 km || 
|-id=014 bgcolor=#d6d6d6
| 157014 ||  || — || August 23, 2003 || Socorro || LINEAR || Tj (2.87) || align=right | 11 km || 
|-id=015 bgcolor=#d6d6d6
| 157015 Walterstraube ||  ||  || August 25, 2003 || Drebach || A. Knöfel, G. Lehmann || — || align=right | 5.6 km || 
|-id=016 bgcolor=#d6d6d6
| 157016 ||  || — || August 23, 2003 || Socorro || LINEAR || — || align=right | 5.5 km || 
|-id=017 bgcolor=#d6d6d6
| 157017 ||  || — || August 23, 2003 || Socorro || LINEAR || — || align=right | 4.1 km || 
|-id=018 bgcolor=#d6d6d6
| 157018 ||  || — || August 23, 2003 || Socorro || LINEAR || — || align=right | 4.0 km || 
|-id=019 bgcolor=#d6d6d6
| 157019 ||  || — || August 23, 2003 || Palomar || NEAT || — || align=right | 6.4 km || 
|-id=020 bgcolor=#d6d6d6
| 157020 Fertőszentmiklós ||  ||  || August 26, 2003 || Piszkéstető || K. Sárneczky, B. Sipőcz || — || align=right | 3.3 km || 
|-id=021 bgcolor=#d6d6d6
| 157021 ||  || — || August 25, 2003 || Reedy Creek || J. Broughton || EOS || align=right | 4.5 km || 
|-id=022 bgcolor=#d6d6d6
| 157022 ||  || — || August 24, 2003 || Socorro || LINEAR || TIR || align=right | 4.4 km || 
|-id=023 bgcolor=#d6d6d6
| 157023 ||  || — || August 22, 2003 || Palomar || NEAT || — || align=right | 3.3 km || 
|-id=024 bgcolor=#d6d6d6
| 157024 ||  || — || August 25, 2003 || Palomar || NEAT || TIR || align=right | 3.9 km || 
|-id=025 bgcolor=#d6d6d6
| 157025 ||  || — || August 25, 2003 || Socorro || LINEAR || HIL3:2 || align=right | 13 km || 
|-id=026 bgcolor=#d6d6d6
| 157026 ||  || — || August 28, 2003 || Haleakala || NEAT || — || align=right | 4.3 km || 
|-id=027 bgcolor=#d6d6d6
| 157027 ||  || — || August 30, 2003 || Socorro || LINEAR || — || align=right | 6.6 km || 
|-id=028 bgcolor=#d6d6d6
| 157028 ||  || — || August 31, 2003 || Haleakala || NEAT || 7:4 || align=right | 7.6 km || 
|-id=029 bgcolor=#d6d6d6
| 157029 ||  || — || August 31, 2003 || Haleakala || NEAT || — || align=right | 4.5 km || 
|-id=030 bgcolor=#d6d6d6
| 157030 ||  || — || August 31, 2003 || Kitt Peak || Spacewatch || — || align=right | 6.4 km || 
|-id=031 bgcolor=#d6d6d6
| 157031 ||  || — || August 31, 2003 || Socorro || LINEAR || EOS || align=right | 5.8 km || 
|-id=032 bgcolor=#d6d6d6
| 157032 ||  || — || September 1, 2003 || Socorro || LINEAR || TIR || align=right | 3.7 km || 
|-id=033 bgcolor=#d6d6d6
| 157033 ||  || — || September 16, 2003 || Kitt Peak || Spacewatch || — || align=right | 4.5 km || 
|-id=034 bgcolor=#d6d6d6
| 157034 ||  || — || September 16, 2003 || Kitt Peak || Spacewatch || — || align=right | 5.5 km || 
|-id=035 bgcolor=#d6d6d6
| 157035 ||  || — || September 17, 2003 || Kitt Peak || Spacewatch || HYG || align=right | 7.6 km || 
|-id=036 bgcolor=#d6d6d6
| 157036 ||  || — || September 16, 2003 || Haleakala || NEAT || HYG || align=right | 5.8 km || 
|-id=037 bgcolor=#d6d6d6
| 157037 ||  || — || September 17, 2003 || Haleakala || NEAT || — || align=right | 5.0 km || 
|-id=038 bgcolor=#d6d6d6
| 157038 ||  || — || September 18, 2003 || Socorro || LINEAR || HYG || align=right | 5.4 km || 
|-id=039 bgcolor=#d6d6d6
| 157039 ||  || — || September 18, 2003 || Palomar || NEAT || — || align=right | 6.2 km || 
|-id=040 bgcolor=#d6d6d6
| 157040 ||  || — || September 19, 2003 || Kitt Peak || Spacewatch || — || align=right | 6.4 km || 
|-id=041 bgcolor=#d6d6d6
| 157041 ||  || — || September 16, 2003 || Palomar || NEAT || — || align=right | 6.1 km || 
|-id=042 bgcolor=#d6d6d6
| 157042 ||  || — || September 16, 2003 || Anderson Mesa || LONEOS || — || align=right | 7.0 km || 
|-id=043 bgcolor=#d6d6d6
| 157043 ||  || — || September 16, 2003 || Anderson Mesa || LONEOS || HYG || align=right | 6.6 km || 
|-id=044 bgcolor=#d6d6d6
| 157044 ||  || — || September 18, 2003 || Palomar || NEAT || — || align=right | 6.0 km || 
|-id=045 bgcolor=#d6d6d6
| 157045 ||  || — || September 16, 2003 || Kitt Peak || Spacewatch || — || align=right | 5.3 km || 
|-id=046 bgcolor=#d6d6d6
| 157046 ||  || — || September 16, 2003 || Kitt Peak || Spacewatch || HYG || align=right | 4.6 km || 
|-id=047 bgcolor=#d6d6d6
| 157047 ||  || — || September 19, 2003 || Haleakala || NEAT || — || align=right | 6.9 km || 
|-id=048 bgcolor=#d6d6d6
| 157048 ||  || — || September 18, 2003 || Socorro || LINEAR || — || align=right | 3.8 km || 
|-id=049 bgcolor=#d6d6d6
| 157049 ||  || — || September 16, 2003 || Palomar || NEAT || — || align=right | 8.2 km || 
|-id=050 bgcolor=#d6d6d6
| 157050 ||  || — || September 18, 2003 || Socorro || LINEAR || HYG || align=right | 4.3 km || 
|-id=051 bgcolor=#d6d6d6
| 157051 ||  || — || September 18, 2003 || Palomar || NEAT || — || align=right | 6.0 km || 
|-id=052 bgcolor=#d6d6d6
| 157052 ||  || — || September 19, 2003 || Socorro || LINEAR || MEL || align=right | 6.6 km || 
|-id=053 bgcolor=#d6d6d6
| 157053 ||  || — || September 18, 2003 || Socorro || LINEAR || — || align=right | 5.1 km || 
|-id=054 bgcolor=#d6d6d6
| 157054 ||  || — || September 20, 2003 || Palomar || NEAT || HYG || align=right | 7.1 km || 
|-id=055 bgcolor=#d6d6d6
| 157055 ||  || — || September 17, 2003 || Socorro || LINEAR || HYG || align=right | 4.2 km || 
|-id=056 bgcolor=#d6d6d6
| 157056 ||  || — || September 19, 2003 || Anderson Mesa || LONEOS || — || align=right | 4.6 km || 
|-id=057 bgcolor=#d6d6d6
| 157057 ||  || — || September 19, 2003 || Anderson Mesa || LONEOS || — || align=right | 4.5 km || 
|-id=058 bgcolor=#d6d6d6
| 157058 ||  || — || September 21, 2003 || Socorro || LINEAR || — || align=right | 6.4 km || 
|-id=059 bgcolor=#d6d6d6
| 157059 ||  || — || September 22, 2003 || Anderson Mesa || LONEOS || — || align=right | 5.0 km || 
|-id=060 bgcolor=#d6d6d6
| 157060 ||  || — || September 21, 2003 || Anderson Mesa || LONEOS || 7:4 || align=right | 6.9 km || 
|-id=061 bgcolor=#d6d6d6
| 157061 ||  || — || September 26, 2003 || Desert Eagle || W. K. Y. Yeung || THM || align=right | 3.8 km || 
|-id=062 bgcolor=#d6d6d6
| 157062 ||  || — || September 25, 2003 || Haleakala || NEAT || — || align=right | 4.1 km || 
|-id=063 bgcolor=#d6d6d6
| 157063 ||  || — || September 24, 2003 || Haleakala || NEAT || — || align=right | 5.9 km || 
|-id=064 bgcolor=#d6d6d6
| 157064 Sedona ||  ||  || September 26, 2003 || Kleť || KLENOT || — || align=right | 6.3 km || 
|-id=065 bgcolor=#d6d6d6
| 157065 ||  || — || September 24, 2003 || Haleakala || NEAT || — || align=right | 6.9 km || 
|-id=066 bgcolor=#d6d6d6
| 157066 ||  || — || September 26, 2003 || Socorro || LINEAR || THM || align=right | 6.9 km || 
|-id=067 bgcolor=#d6d6d6
| 157067 ||  || — || September 26, 2003 || Socorro || LINEAR || — || align=right | 4.5 km || 
|-id=068 bgcolor=#d6d6d6
| 157068 ||  || — || September 29, 2003 || Socorro || LINEAR || THM || align=right | 3.9 km || 
|-id=069 bgcolor=#d6d6d6
| 157069 ||  || — || September 17, 2003 || Palomar || NEAT || — || align=right | 4.9 km || 
|-id=070 bgcolor=#d6d6d6
| 157070 ||  || — || September 26, 2003 || Socorro || LINEAR || ALA || align=right | 8.7 km || 
|-id=071 bgcolor=#d6d6d6
| 157071 ||  || — || October 1, 2003 || Socorro || LINEAR || — || align=right | 6.9 km || 
|-id=072 bgcolor=#d6d6d6
| 157072 ||  || — || October 18, 2003 || Kingsnake || J. V. McClusky || EOS || align=right | 3.6 km || 
|-id=073 bgcolor=#d6d6d6
| 157073 ||  || — || October 19, 2003 || Goodricke-Pigott || R. A. Tucker || 7:4 || align=right | 7.5 km || 
|-id=074 bgcolor=#d6d6d6
| 157074 ||  || — || October 16, 2003 || Palomar || NEAT || EUP || align=right | 9.2 km || 
|-id=075 bgcolor=#d6d6d6
| 157075 ||  || — || October 27, 2003 || Haleakala || NEAT || — || align=right | 6.7 km || 
|-id=076 bgcolor=#d6d6d6
| 157076 ||  || — || October 29, 2003 || Anderson Mesa || LONEOS || 3:2 || align=right | 8.0 km || 
|-id=077 bgcolor=#d6d6d6
| 157077 ||  || — || October 16, 2003 || Palomar || NEAT || HYG || align=right | 5.8 km || 
|-id=078 bgcolor=#d6d6d6
| 157078 ||  || — || November 18, 2003 || Palomar || NEAT || 7:4 || align=right | 6.2 km || 
|-id=079 bgcolor=#fefefe
| 157079 ||  || — || November 19, 2003 || Anderson Mesa || LONEOS || H || align=right | 1.5 km || 
|-id=080 bgcolor=#fefefe
| 157080 ||  || — || December 17, 2003 || Socorro || LINEAR || H || align=right | 1.1 km || 
|-id=081 bgcolor=#fefefe
| 157081 ||  || — || December 28, 2003 || Socorro || LINEAR || H || align=right data-sort-value="0.92" | 920 m || 
|-id=082 bgcolor=#fefefe
| 157082 ||  || — || February 11, 2004 || Palomar || NEAT || — || align=right data-sort-value="0.96" | 960 m || 
|-id=083 bgcolor=#fefefe
| 157083 ||  || — || February 14, 2004 || Socorro || LINEAR || H || align=right | 1.1 km || 
|-id=084 bgcolor=#fefefe
| 157084 ||  || — || February 11, 2004 || Socorro || LINEAR || H || align=right | 1.5 km || 
|-id=085 bgcolor=#fefefe
| 157085 ||  || — || March 12, 2004 || Palomar || NEAT || — || align=right | 1.3 km || 
|-id=086 bgcolor=#fefefe
| 157086 ||  || — || March 15, 2004 || Desert Eagle || W. K. Y. Yeung || — || align=right | 2.7 km || 
|-id=087 bgcolor=#fefefe
| 157087 ||  || — || March 15, 2004 || Palomar || NEAT || H || align=right | 1.2 km || 
|-id=088 bgcolor=#fefefe
| 157088 ||  || — || March 13, 2004 || Palomar || NEAT || — || align=right | 1.1 km || 
|-id=089 bgcolor=#fefefe
| 157089 ||  || — || March 14, 2004 || Kitt Peak || Spacewatch || V || align=right | 1.1 km || 
|-id=090 bgcolor=#fefefe
| 157090 ||  || — || March 17, 2004 || Socorro || LINEAR || — || align=right data-sort-value="0.98" | 980 m || 
|-id=091 bgcolor=#fefefe
| 157091 ||  || — || March 16, 2004 || Campo Imperatore || CINEOS || — || align=right | 1.0 km || 
|-id=092 bgcolor=#fefefe
| 157092 ||  || — || March 22, 2004 || Socorro || LINEAR || FLO || align=right data-sort-value="0.94" | 940 m || 
|-id=093 bgcolor=#fefefe
| 157093 ||  || — || April 12, 2004 || Kitt Peak || Spacewatch || — || align=right | 1.3 km || 
|-id=094 bgcolor=#fefefe
| 157094 ||  || — || April 17, 2004 || Palomar || NEAT || — || align=right | 1.1 km || 
|-id=095 bgcolor=#fefefe
| 157095 ||  || — || April 17, 2004 || Socorro || LINEAR || — || align=right | 1.4 km || 
|-id=096 bgcolor=#fefefe
| 157096 ||  || — || April 20, 2004 || Socorro || LINEAR || FLO || align=right | 1.2 km || 
|-id=097 bgcolor=#fefefe
| 157097 ||  || — || April 24, 2004 || Kitt Peak || Spacewatch || — || align=right | 1.4 km || 
|-id=098 bgcolor=#fefefe
| 157098 ||  || — || April 25, 2004 || Kitt Peak || Spacewatch || NYS || align=right data-sort-value="0.79" | 790 m || 
|-id=099 bgcolor=#fefefe
| 157099 ||  || — || April 26, 2004 || Siding Spring || SSS || PHO || align=right | 2.3 km || 
|-id=100 bgcolor=#fefefe
| 157100 ||  || — || May 13, 2004 || Kitt Peak || Spacewatch || — || align=right data-sort-value="0.97" | 970 m || 
|}

157101–157200 

|-bgcolor=#fefefe
| 157101 ||  || — || May 9, 2004 || Kitt Peak || Spacewatch || — || align=right | 1.3 km || 
|-id=102 bgcolor=#fefefe
| 157102 ||  || — || May 9, 2004 || Kitt Peak || Spacewatch || — || align=right data-sort-value="0.99" | 990 m || 
|-id=103 bgcolor=#fefefe
| 157103 ||  || — || May 11, 2004 || Anderson Mesa || LONEOS || FLO || align=right data-sort-value="0.95" | 950 m || 
|-id=104 bgcolor=#fefefe
| 157104 ||  || — || May 15, 2004 || Socorro || LINEAR || — || align=right | 1.3 km || 
|-id=105 bgcolor=#fefefe
| 157105 ||  || — || May 15, 2004 || Socorro || LINEAR || — || align=right | 1.4 km || 
|-id=106 bgcolor=#fefefe
| 157106 ||  || — || May 15, 2004 || Socorro || LINEAR || — || align=right | 2.0 km || 
|-id=107 bgcolor=#fefefe
| 157107 ||  || — || May 15, 2004 || Socorro || LINEAR || — || align=right | 1.6 km || 
|-id=108 bgcolor=#fefefe
| 157108 ||  || — || June 12, 2004 || Catalina || CSS || — || align=right | 1.4 km || 
|-id=109 bgcolor=#fefefe
| 157109 ||  || — || June 11, 2004 || Socorro || LINEAR || — || align=right | 1.2 km || 
|-id=110 bgcolor=#fefefe
| 157110 ||  || — || June 10, 2004 || Campo Imperatore || CINEOS || FLO || align=right | 1.4 km || 
|-id=111 bgcolor=#FA8072
| 157111 ||  || — || June 15, 2004 || Socorro || LINEAR || — || align=right | 1.6 km || 
|-id=112 bgcolor=#fefefe
| 157112 ||  || — || June 15, 2004 || Socorro || LINEAR || FLO || align=right | 1.0 km || 
|-id=113 bgcolor=#fefefe
| 157113 ||  || — || June 15, 2004 || Socorro || LINEAR || — || align=right | 1.7 km || 
|-id=114 bgcolor=#fefefe
| 157114 ||  || — || June 15, 2004 || Kitt Peak || Spacewatch || V || align=right | 1.2 km || 
|-id=115 bgcolor=#fefefe
| 157115 ||  || — || June 12, 2004 || Palomar || NEAT || V || align=right | 1.1 km || 
|-id=116 bgcolor=#fefefe
| 157116 ||  || — || June 16, 2004 || Socorro || LINEAR || — || align=right | 2.5 km || 
|-id=117 bgcolor=#fefefe
| 157117 ||  || — || June 22, 2004 || Kitt Peak || Spacewatch || — || align=right | 1.3 km || 
|-id=118 bgcolor=#fefefe
| 157118 || 2004 NT || — || July 7, 2004 || Campo Imperatore || CINEOS || — || align=right | 1.4 km || 
|-id=119 bgcolor=#fefefe
| 157119 ||  || — || July 9, 2004 || Siding Spring || SSS || — || align=right | 1.2 km || 
|-id=120 bgcolor=#FA8072
| 157120 ||  || — || July 11, 2004 || Socorro || LINEAR || — || align=right | 1.4 km || 
|-id=121 bgcolor=#fefefe
| 157121 ||  || — || July 9, 2004 || Socorro || LINEAR || FLO || align=right | 2.4 km || 
|-id=122 bgcolor=#fefefe
| 157122 ||  || — || July 9, 2004 || Palomar || NEAT || NYS || align=right | 1.1 km || 
|-id=123 bgcolor=#fefefe
| 157123 ||  || — || July 11, 2004 || Socorro || LINEAR || — || align=right | 1.4 km || 
|-id=124 bgcolor=#fefefe
| 157124 ||  || — || July 11, 2004 || Socorro || LINEAR || V || align=right | 1.2 km || 
|-id=125 bgcolor=#fefefe
| 157125 ||  || — || July 11, 2004 || Socorro || LINEAR || NYS || align=right | 1.1 km || 
|-id=126 bgcolor=#fefefe
| 157126 ||  || — || July 11, 2004 || Socorro || LINEAR || — || align=right | 1.4 km || 
|-id=127 bgcolor=#fefefe
| 157127 ||  || — || July 11, 2004 || Socorro || LINEAR || — || align=right | 3.4 km || 
|-id=128 bgcolor=#fefefe
| 157128 ||  || — || July 14, 2004 || Socorro || LINEAR || — || align=right | 2.3 km || 
|-id=129 bgcolor=#fefefe
| 157129 ||  || — || July 14, 2004 || Socorro || LINEAR || — || align=right | 1.1 km || 
|-id=130 bgcolor=#E9E9E9
| 157130 ||  || — || July 15, 2004 || Socorro || LINEAR || INO || align=right | 2.4 km || 
|-id=131 bgcolor=#E9E9E9
| 157131 ||  || — || July 15, 2004 || Socorro || LINEAR || — || align=right | 5.4 km || 
|-id=132 bgcolor=#fefefe
| 157132 ||  || — || July 11, 2004 || Socorro || LINEAR || — || align=right | 1.3 km || 
|-id=133 bgcolor=#fefefe
| 157133 ||  || — || July 9, 2004 || Anderson Mesa || LONEOS || — || align=right | 1.2 km || 
|-id=134 bgcolor=#fefefe
| 157134 || 2004 OR || — || July 17, 2004 || 7300 Observatory || W. K. Y. Yeung || EUT || align=right data-sort-value="0.79" | 790 m || 
|-id=135 bgcolor=#fefefe
| 157135 ||  || — || July 16, 2004 || Socorro || LINEAR || — || align=right | 1.2 km || 
|-id=136 bgcolor=#fefefe
| 157136 ||  || — || July 16, 2004 || Socorro || LINEAR || NYS || align=right | 1.2 km || 
|-id=137 bgcolor=#fefefe
| 157137 ||  || — || July 16, 2004 || Socorro || LINEAR || — || align=right | 1.3 km || 
|-id=138 bgcolor=#fefefe
| 157138 ||  || — || July 17, 2004 || Reedy Creek || J. Broughton || ERI || align=right | 3.0 km || 
|-id=139 bgcolor=#fefefe
| 157139 ||  || — || July 25, 2004 || Anderson Mesa || LONEOS || V || align=right | 1.1 km || 
|-id=140 bgcolor=#fefefe
| 157140 ||  || — || July 25, 2004 || Anderson Mesa || LONEOS || V || align=right | 1.1 km || 
|-id=141 bgcolor=#E9E9E9
| 157141 Sopron ||  ||  || August 6, 2004 || Piszkéstető || K. Sárneczky, T. Szalai || — || align=right | 2.1 km || 
|-id=142 bgcolor=#fefefe
| 157142 ||  || — || August 6, 2004 || Reedy Creek || J. Broughton || NYS || align=right | 2.0 km || 
|-id=143 bgcolor=#fefefe
| 157143 ||  || — || August 6, 2004 || Reedy Creek || J. Broughton || NYS || align=right | 1.3 km || 
|-id=144 bgcolor=#E9E9E9
| 157144 ||  || — || August 6, 2004 || Palomar || NEAT || MRX || align=right | 1.8 km || 
|-id=145 bgcolor=#E9E9E9
| 157145 ||  || — || August 3, 2004 || Siding Spring || SSS || — || align=right | 1.4 km || 
|-id=146 bgcolor=#d6d6d6
| 157146 ||  || — || August 6, 2004 || Palomar || NEAT || — || align=right | 4.2 km || 
|-id=147 bgcolor=#fefefe
| 157147 ||  || — || August 6, 2004 || Palomar || NEAT || — || align=right | 1.4 km || 
|-id=148 bgcolor=#d6d6d6
| 157148 ||  || — || August 7, 2004 || Palomar || NEAT || 628 || align=right | 3.1 km || 
|-id=149 bgcolor=#fefefe
| 157149 ||  || — || August 7, 2004 || Palomar || NEAT || NYS || align=right | 1.2 km || 
|-id=150 bgcolor=#fefefe
| 157150 ||  || — || August 7, 2004 || Palomar || NEAT || NYS || align=right | 1.2 km || 
|-id=151 bgcolor=#fefefe
| 157151 ||  || — || August 7, 2004 || Palomar || NEAT || NYS || align=right | 1.4 km || 
|-id=152 bgcolor=#fefefe
| 157152 ||  || — || August 8, 2004 || Anderson Mesa || LONEOS || NYS || align=right | 1.2 km || 
|-id=153 bgcolor=#E9E9E9
| 157153 ||  || — || August 8, 2004 || Anderson Mesa || LONEOS || — || align=right | 2.1 km || 
|-id=154 bgcolor=#fefefe
| 157154 ||  || — || August 8, 2004 || Anderson Mesa || LONEOS || MAS || align=right | 1.3 km || 
|-id=155 bgcolor=#E9E9E9
| 157155 ||  || — || August 6, 2004 || Palomar || NEAT || MAR || align=right | 2.8 km || 
|-id=156 bgcolor=#fefefe
| 157156 ||  || — || August 8, 2004 || Socorro || LINEAR || NYS || align=right | 1.0 km || 
|-id=157 bgcolor=#fefefe
| 157157 ||  || — || August 5, 2004 || Palomar || NEAT || V || align=right | 1.1 km || 
|-id=158 bgcolor=#E9E9E9
| 157158 ||  || — || August 6, 2004 || Palomar || NEAT || — || align=right | 1.3 km || 
|-id=159 bgcolor=#fefefe
| 157159 ||  || — || August 8, 2004 || Socorro || LINEAR || — || align=right | 2.5 km || 
|-id=160 bgcolor=#fefefe
| 157160 ||  || — || August 8, 2004 || Socorro || LINEAR || — || align=right | 1.3 km || 
|-id=161 bgcolor=#fefefe
| 157161 ||  || — || August 8, 2004 || Socorro || LINEAR || MAS || align=right | 1.2 km || 
|-id=162 bgcolor=#E9E9E9
| 157162 ||  || — || August 8, 2004 || Anderson Mesa || LONEOS || AGN || align=right | 1.7 km || 
|-id=163 bgcolor=#fefefe
| 157163 ||  || — || August 8, 2004 || Anderson Mesa || LONEOS || — || align=right | 1.2 km || 
|-id=164 bgcolor=#fefefe
| 157164 ||  || — || August 9, 2004 || Socorro || LINEAR || V || align=right | 1.1 km || 
|-id=165 bgcolor=#fefefe
| 157165 ||  || — || August 9, 2004 || Socorro || LINEAR || SUL || align=right | 3.4 km || 
|-id=166 bgcolor=#fefefe
| 157166 ||  || — || August 9, 2004 || Socorro || LINEAR || MAS || align=right | 1.3 km || 
|-id=167 bgcolor=#fefefe
| 157167 ||  || — || August 9, 2004 || Anderson Mesa || LONEOS || NYS || align=right | 1.1 km || 
|-id=168 bgcolor=#fefefe
| 157168 ||  || — || August 6, 2004 || Campo Imperatore || CINEOS || MAS || align=right data-sort-value="0.96" | 960 m || 
|-id=169 bgcolor=#fefefe
| 157169 ||  || — || August 7, 2004 || Palomar || NEAT || MAS || align=right | 1.4 km || 
|-id=170 bgcolor=#fefefe
| 157170 ||  || — || August 8, 2004 || Palomar || NEAT || — || align=right | 1.3 km || 
|-id=171 bgcolor=#fefefe
| 157171 ||  || — || August 8, 2004 || Socorro || LINEAR || NYS || align=right | 1.3 km || 
|-id=172 bgcolor=#fefefe
| 157172 ||  || — || August 8, 2004 || Socorro || LINEAR || FLO || align=right | 1.1 km || 
|-id=173 bgcolor=#fefefe
| 157173 ||  || — || August 8, 2004 || Anderson Mesa || LONEOS || NYS || align=right | 1.0 km || 
|-id=174 bgcolor=#fefefe
| 157174 ||  || — || August 9, 2004 || Socorro || LINEAR || NYS || align=right | 1.1 km || 
|-id=175 bgcolor=#fefefe
| 157175 ||  || — || August 9, 2004 || Socorro || LINEAR || NYS || align=right | 1.1 km || 
|-id=176 bgcolor=#fefefe
| 157176 ||  || — || August 9, 2004 || Socorro || LINEAR || — || align=right | 3.1 km || 
|-id=177 bgcolor=#fefefe
| 157177 ||  || — || August 9, 2004 || Socorro || LINEAR || — || align=right | 1.1 km || 
|-id=178 bgcolor=#E9E9E9
| 157178 ||  || — || August 9, 2004 || Socorro || LINEAR || — || align=right | 2.4 km || 
|-id=179 bgcolor=#fefefe
| 157179 ||  || — || August 11, 2004 || Consell || Consell Obs. || — || align=right | 1.4 km || 
|-id=180 bgcolor=#fefefe
| 157180 ||  || — || August 8, 2004 || Socorro || LINEAR || — || align=right | 1.2 km || 
|-id=181 bgcolor=#fefefe
| 157181 ||  || — || August 10, 2004 || Socorro || LINEAR || NYS || align=right | 1.3 km || 
|-id=182 bgcolor=#d6d6d6
| 157182 ||  || — || August 10, 2004 || Socorro || LINEAR || ALA || align=right | 5.9 km || 
|-id=183 bgcolor=#E9E9E9
| 157183 ||  || — || August 10, 2004 || Socorro || LINEAR || — || align=right | 3.8 km || 
|-id=184 bgcolor=#fefefe
| 157184 ||  || — || August 10, 2004 || Socorro || LINEAR || — || align=right | 2.9 km || 
|-id=185 bgcolor=#FA8072
| 157185 ||  || — || August 10, 2004 || Socorro || LINEAR || — || align=right | 1.2 km || 
|-id=186 bgcolor=#fefefe
| 157186 ||  || — || August 11, 2004 || Campo Imperatore || CINEOS || MAS || align=right data-sort-value="0.96" | 960 m || 
|-id=187 bgcolor=#d6d6d6
| 157187 ||  || — || August 11, 2004 || Socorro || LINEAR || — || align=right | 10 km || 
|-id=188 bgcolor=#E9E9E9
| 157188 ||  || — || August 12, 2004 || Socorro || LINEAR || JUN || align=right | 4.4 km || 
|-id=189 bgcolor=#fefefe
| 157189 ||  || — || August 15, 2004 || Campo Imperatore || CINEOS || NYS || align=right data-sort-value="0.99" | 990 m || 
|-id=190 bgcolor=#fefefe
| 157190 ||  || — || August 8, 2004 || Socorro || LINEAR || — || align=right | 1.3 km || 
|-id=191 bgcolor=#E9E9E9
| 157191 ||  || — || August 20, 2004 || Catalina || CSS || EUN || align=right | 2.7 km || 
|-id=192 bgcolor=#d6d6d6
| 157192 ||  || — || August 19, 2004 || Siding Spring || SSS || EMA || align=right | 4.9 km || 
|-id=193 bgcolor=#E9E9E9
| 157193 ||  || — || August 17, 2004 || Socorro || LINEAR || — || align=right | 4.0 km || 
|-id=194 bgcolor=#E9E9E9
| 157194 Saddlemyer ||  ||  || August 21, 2004 || Mauna Kea || D. D. Balam || — || align=right | 2.2 km || 
|-id=195 bgcolor=#d6d6d6
| 157195 ||  || — || August 22, 2004 || Goodricke-Pigott || Goodricke-Pigott Obs. || EOS || align=right | 3.4 km || 
|-id=196 bgcolor=#fefefe
| 157196 ||  || — || August 25, 2004 || Kitt Peak || Spacewatch || ERI || align=right | 2.3 km || 
|-id=197 bgcolor=#d6d6d6
| 157197 ||  || — || August 20, 2004 || Catalina || CSS || — || align=right | 5.0 km || 
|-id=198 bgcolor=#d6d6d6
| 157198 ||  || — || September 4, 2004 || Needville || J. Dellinger, A. Lowe || — || align=right | 4.0 km || 
|-id=199 bgcolor=#d6d6d6
| 157199 ||  || — || September 6, 2004 || Goodricke-Pigott || Goodricke-Pigott Obs. || KOR || align=right | 2.1 km || 
|-id=200 bgcolor=#E9E9E9
| 157200 ||  || — || September 6, 2004 || Goodricke-Pigott || Goodricke-Pigott Obs. || WIT || align=right | 1.9 km || 
|}

157201–157300 

|-bgcolor=#fefefe
| 157201 ||  || — || September 4, 2004 || Palomar || NEAT || NYS || align=right | 1.4 km || 
|-id=202 bgcolor=#E9E9E9
| 157202 ||  || — || September 6, 2004 || Siding Spring || SSS || — || align=right | 1.8 km || 
|-id=203 bgcolor=#E9E9E9
| 157203 ||  || — || September 7, 2004 || Socorro || LINEAR || — || align=right | 1.6 km || 
|-id=204 bgcolor=#fefefe
| 157204 ||  || — || September 7, 2004 || Socorro || LINEAR || NYS || align=right | 2.6 km || 
|-id=205 bgcolor=#d6d6d6
| 157205 ||  || — || September 7, 2004 || Kitt Peak || Spacewatch || — || align=right | 4.4 km || 
|-id=206 bgcolor=#E9E9E9
| 157206 ||  || — || September 7, 2004 || Kitt Peak || Spacewatch || — || align=right | 2.5 km || 
|-id=207 bgcolor=#d6d6d6
| 157207 ||  || — || September 7, 2004 || Kitt Peak || Spacewatch || — || align=right | 2.8 km || 
|-id=208 bgcolor=#E9E9E9
| 157208 ||  || — || September 7, 2004 || Kitt Peak || Spacewatch || — || align=right | 1.2 km || 
|-id=209 bgcolor=#d6d6d6
| 157209 ||  || — || September 7, 2004 || Kitt Peak || Spacewatch || KOR || align=right | 2.6 km || 
|-id=210 bgcolor=#E9E9E9
| 157210 ||  || — || September 6, 2004 || Siding Spring || SSS || — || align=right | 3.3 km || 
|-id=211 bgcolor=#d6d6d6
| 157211 ||  || — || September 6, 2004 || Siding Spring || SSS || — || align=right | 6.3 km || 
|-id=212 bgcolor=#d6d6d6
| 157212 ||  || — || September 6, 2004 || Siding Spring || SSS || — || align=right | 3.1 km || 
|-id=213 bgcolor=#fefefe
| 157213 ||  || — || September 6, 2004 || Siding Spring || SSS || NYS || align=right | 1.1 km || 
|-id=214 bgcolor=#E9E9E9
| 157214 ||  || — || September 6, 2004 || Siding Spring || SSS || — || align=right | 3.9 km || 
|-id=215 bgcolor=#fefefe
| 157215 ||  || — || September 6, 2004 || Siding Spring || SSS || — || align=right | 1.3 km || 
|-id=216 bgcolor=#fefefe
| 157216 ||  || — || September 7, 2004 || Socorro || LINEAR || NYS || align=right data-sort-value="0.97" | 970 m || 
|-id=217 bgcolor=#fefefe
| 157217 ||  || — || September 7, 2004 || Socorro || LINEAR || MAS || align=right | 1.1 km || 
|-id=218 bgcolor=#E9E9E9
| 157218 ||  || — || September 7, 2004 || Socorro || LINEAR || — || align=right | 2.6 km || 
|-id=219 bgcolor=#E9E9E9
| 157219 ||  || — || September 7, 2004 || Socorro || LINEAR || — || align=right | 2.2 km || 
|-id=220 bgcolor=#fefefe
| 157220 ||  || — || September 8, 2004 || Socorro || LINEAR || — || align=right | 3.1 km || 
|-id=221 bgcolor=#fefefe
| 157221 ||  || — || September 8, 2004 || Socorro || LINEAR || SVE || align=right | 3.7 km || 
|-id=222 bgcolor=#E9E9E9
| 157222 ||  || — || September 8, 2004 || Socorro || LINEAR || — || align=right | 1.5 km || 
|-id=223 bgcolor=#fefefe
| 157223 ||  || — || September 8, 2004 || Socorro || LINEAR || NYS || align=right | 1.1 km || 
|-id=224 bgcolor=#E9E9E9
| 157224 ||  || — || September 8, 2004 || Socorro || LINEAR || HOF || align=right | 4.5 km || 
|-id=225 bgcolor=#d6d6d6
| 157225 ||  || — || September 8, 2004 || Socorro || LINEAR || KOR || align=right | 2.6 km || 
|-id=226 bgcolor=#fefefe
| 157226 ||  || — || September 8, 2004 || Socorro || LINEAR || NYS || align=right | 1.1 km || 
|-id=227 bgcolor=#E9E9E9
| 157227 ||  || — || September 8, 2004 || Socorro || LINEAR || HEN || align=right | 1.6 km || 
|-id=228 bgcolor=#d6d6d6
| 157228 ||  || — || September 8, 2004 || Socorro || LINEAR || KOR || align=right | 2.6 km || 
|-id=229 bgcolor=#d6d6d6
| 157229 ||  || — || September 8, 2004 || Socorro || LINEAR || — || align=right | 3.0 km || 
|-id=230 bgcolor=#fefefe
| 157230 ||  || — || September 8, 2004 || Socorro || LINEAR || NYS || align=right | 1.3 km || 
|-id=231 bgcolor=#d6d6d6
| 157231 ||  || — || September 8, 2004 || Socorro || LINEAR || — || align=right | 4.7 km || 
|-id=232 bgcolor=#E9E9E9
| 157232 ||  || — || September 8, 2004 || Socorro || LINEAR || — || align=right | 2.8 km || 
|-id=233 bgcolor=#E9E9E9
| 157233 ||  || — || September 8, 2004 || Socorro || LINEAR || AGN || align=right | 2.6 km || 
|-id=234 bgcolor=#E9E9E9
| 157234 ||  || — || September 8, 2004 || Socorro || LINEAR || — || align=right | 1.5 km || 
|-id=235 bgcolor=#E9E9E9
| 157235 ||  || — || September 7, 2004 || Socorro || LINEAR || MAR || align=right | 1.7 km || 
|-id=236 bgcolor=#fefefe
| 157236 ||  || — || September 8, 2004 || Socorro || LINEAR || — || align=right | 1.4 km || 
|-id=237 bgcolor=#E9E9E9
| 157237 ||  || — || September 8, 2004 || Socorro || LINEAR || — || align=right | 3.4 km || 
|-id=238 bgcolor=#E9E9E9
| 157238 ||  || — || September 8, 2004 || Socorro || LINEAR || GEF || align=right | 2.0 km || 
|-id=239 bgcolor=#E9E9E9
| 157239 ||  || — || September 8, 2004 || Socorro || LINEAR || — || align=right | 1.4 km || 
|-id=240 bgcolor=#d6d6d6
| 157240 ||  || — || September 8, 2004 || Socorro || LINEAR || — || align=right | 4.7 km || 
|-id=241 bgcolor=#fefefe
| 157241 ||  || — || September 8, 2004 || Palomar || NEAT || ERI || align=right | 4.2 km || 
|-id=242 bgcolor=#E9E9E9
| 157242 ||  || — || September 8, 2004 || Palomar || NEAT || — || align=right | 2.3 km || 
|-id=243 bgcolor=#E9E9E9
| 157243 ||  || — || September 9, 2004 || Socorro || LINEAR || — || align=right | 1.7 km || 
|-id=244 bgcolor=#E9E9E9
| 157244 ||  || — || September 9, 2004 || Kitt Peak || Spacewatch || — || align=right | 3.8 km || 
|-id=245 bgcolor=#E9E9E9
| 157245 ||  || — || September 7, 2004 || Goodricke-Pigott || R. A. Tucker || — || align=right | 2.3 km || 
|-id=246 bgcolor=#d6d6d6
| 157246 ||  || — || September 9, 2004 || Socorro || LINEAR || KOR || align=right | 2.4 km || 
|-id=247 bgcolor=#d6d6d6
| 157247 ||  || — || September 7, 2004 || Kitt Peak || Spacewatch || — || align=right | 3.2 km || 
|-id=248 bgcolor=#fefefe
| 157248 ||  || — || September 7, 2004 || Kitt Peak || Spacewatch || — || align=right data-sort-value="0.88" | 880 m || 
|-id=249 bgcolor=#fefefe
| 157249 ||  || — || September 7, 2004 || Kitt Peak || Spacewatch || V || align=right | 1.0 km || 
|-id=250 bgcolor=#E9E9E9
| 157250 ||  || — || September 9, 2004 || Socorro || LINEAR || — || align=right | 3.5 km || 
|-id=251 bgcolor=#fefefe
| 157251 ||  || — || September 9, 2004 || Socorro || LINEAR || NYS || align=right | 1.0 km || 
|-id=252 bgcolor=#E9E9E9
| 157252 ||  || — || September 9, 2004 || Socorro || LINEAR || AGN || align=right | 2.3 km || 
|-id=253 bgcolor=#d6d6d6
| 157253 ||  || — || September 9, 2004 || Socorro || LINEAR || — || align=right | 6.0 km || 
|-id=254 bgcolor=#E9E9E9
| 157254 ||  || — || September 9, 2004 || Socorro || LINEAR || — || align=right | 1.9 km || 
|-id=255 bgcolor=#E9E9E9
| 157255 ||  || — || September 10, 2004 || Socorro || LINEAR || — || align=right | 2.3 km || 
|-id=256 bgcolor=#E9E9E9
| 157256 ||  || — || September 10, 2004 || Socorro || LINEAR || — || align=right | 3.6 km || 
|-id=257 bgcolor=#d6d6d6
| 157257 ||  || — || September 7, 2004 || Socorro || LINEAR || — || align=right | 4.3 km || 
|-id=258 bgcolor=#E9E9E9
| 157258 Leach ||  ||  || September 12, 2004 || Jarnac || Jarnac Obs. || — || align=right | 3.3 km || 
|-id=259 bgcolor=#fefefe
| 157259 ||  || — || September 9, 2004 || Socorro || LINEAR || NYS || align=right | 1.4 km || 
|-id=260 bgcolor=#E9E9E9
| 157260 ||  || — || September 10, 2004 || Socorro || LINEAR || — || align=right | 2.8 km || 
|-id=261 bgcolor=#E9E9E9
| 157261 ||  || — || September 10, 2004 || Socorro || LINEAR || — || align=right | 3.8 km || 
|-id=262 bgcolor=#d6d6d6
| 157262 ||  || — || September 10, 2004 || Socorro || LINEAR || Tj (2.95) || align=right | 7.8 km || 
|-id=263 bgcolor=#E9E9E9
| 157263 ||  || — || September 10, 2004 || Socorro || LINEAR || — || align=right | 3.9 km || 
|-id=264 bgcolor=#E9E9E9
| 157264 ||  || — || September 10, 2004 || Socorro || LINEAR || EUN || align=right | 2.3 km || 
|-id=265 bgcolor=#d6d6d6
| 157265 ||  || — || September 10, 2004 || Socorro || LINEAR || BRA || align=right | 2.5 km || 
|-id=266 bgcolor=#E9E9E9
| 157266 ||  || — || September 10, 2004 || Socorro || LINEAR || — || align=right | 3.5 km || 
|-id=267 bgcolor=#E9E9E9
| 157267 ||  || — || September 10, 2004 || Socorro || LINEAR || — || align=right | 1.9 km || 
|-id=268 bgcolor=#E9E9E9
| 157268 ||  || — || September 10, 2004 || Socorro || LINEAR || — || align=right | 4.5 km || 
|-id=269 bgcolor=#E9E9E9
| 157269 ||  || — || September 11, 2004 || Socorro || LINEAR || — || align=right | 4.5 km || 
|-id=270 bgcolor=#E9E9E9
| 157270 ||  || — || September 11, 2004 || Socorro || LINEAR || — || align=right | 4.4 km || 
|-id=271 bgcolor=#fefefe
| 157271 Gurtovenko ||  ||  || September 13, 2004 || Andrushivka || G. Koval'chuk, V. Lokot' || — || align=right | 1.6 km || 
|-id=272 bgcolor=#E9E9E9
| 157272 ||  || — || September 8, 2004 || Socorro || LINEAR || — || align=right | 2.6 km || 
|-id=273 bgcolor=#E9E9E9
| 157273 ||  || — || September 9, 2004 || Socorro || LINEAR || — || align=right | 4.4 km || 
|-id=274 bgcolor=#d6d6d6
| 157274 ||  || — || September 9, 2004 || Kitt Peak || Spacewatch || HYG || align=right | 4.7 km || 
|-id=275 bgcolor=#d6d6d6
| 157275 ||  || — || September 9, 2004 || Kitt Peak || Spacewatch || KOR || align=right | 2.2 km || 
|-id=276 bgcolor=#d6d6d6
| 157276 ||  || — || September 9, 2004 || Kitt Peak || Spacewatch || — || align=right | 3.6 km || 
|-id=277 bgcolor=#d6d6d6
| 157277 ||  || — || September 9, 2004 || Kitt Peak || Spacewatch || — || align=right | 3.7 km || 
|-id=278 bgcolor=#E9E9E9
| 157278 ||  || — || September 9, 2004 || Kitt Peak || Spacewatch || — || align=right | 1.3 km || 
|-id=279 bgcolor=#d6d6d6
| 157279 ||  || — || September 9, 2004 || Kitt Peak || Spacewatch || — || align=right | 3.7 km || 
|-id=280 bgcolor=#d6d6d6
| 157280 ||  || — || September 9, 2004 || Kitt Peak || Spacewatch || — || align=right | 3.7 km || 
|-id=281 bgcolor=#fefefe
| 157281 ||  || — || September 6, 2004 || Palomar || NEAT || — || align=right | 2.0 km || 
|-id=282 bgcolor=#fefefe
| 157282 ||  || — || September 10, 2004 || Kitt Peak || Spacewatch || — || align=right | 1.2 km || 
|-id=283 bgcolor=#d6d6d6
| 157283 ||  || — || September 15, 2004 || Kitt Peak || Spacewatch || KOR || align=right | 2.2 km || 
|-id=284 bgcolor=#E9E9E9
| 157284 ||  || — || September 15, 2004 || Socorro || LINEAR || — || align=right | 2.3 km || 
|-id=285 bgcolor=#d6d6d6
| 157285 ||  || — || September 15, 2004 || Kitt Peak || Spacewatch || — || align=right | 4.7 km || 
|-id=286 bgcolor=#d6d6d6
| 157286 ||  || — || September 15, 2004 || 7300 Observatory || W. K. Y. Yeung || — || align=right | 4.9 km || 
|-id=287 bgcolor=#FA8072
| 157287 ||  || — || September 10, 2004 || Palomar || NEAT || — || align=right | 1.5 km || 
|-id=288 bgcolor=#fefefe
| 157288 ||  || — || September 10, 2004 || Siding Spring || SSS || — || align=right | 2.6 km || 
|-id=289 bgcolor=#fefefe
| 157289 ||  || — || September 12, 2004 || Socorro || LINEAR || — || align=right | 1.3 km || 
|-id=290 bgcolor=#d6d6d6
| 157290 ||  || — || September 12, 2004 || Socorro || LINEAR || — || align=right | 3.0 km || 
|-id=291 bgcolor=#E9E9E9
| 157291 ||  || — || September 13, 2004 || Kitt Peak || Spacewatch || — || align=right | 3.2 km || 
|-id=292 bgcolor=#d6d6d6
| 157292 ||  || — || September 15, 2004 || 7300 Observatory || 7300 Obs. || EOS || align=right | 3.3 km || 
|-id=293 bgcolor=#E9E9E9
| 157293 ||  || — || September 13, 2004 || Socorro || LINEAR || — || align=right | 3.5 km || 
|-id=294 bgcolor=#E9E9E9
| 157294 ||  || — || September 13, 2004 || Socorro || LINEAR || — || align=right | 4.6 km || 
|-id=295 bgcolor=#E9E9E9
| 157295 ||  || — || September 13, 2004 || Socorro || LINEAR || GEF || align=right | 2.3 km || 
|-id=296 bgcolor=#E9E9E9
| 157296 ||  || — || September 15, 2004 || Anderson Mesa || LONEOS || — || align=right | 2.9 km || 
|-id=297 bgcolor=#E9E9E9
| 157297 ||  || — || September 15, 2004 || Anderson Mesa || LONEOS || — || align=right | 1.3 km || 
|-id=298 bgcolor=#d6d6d6
| 157298 ||  || — || September 15, 2004 || Kitt Peak || Spacewatch || — || align=right | 3.7 km || 
|-id=299 bgcolor=#E9E9E9
| 157299 ||  || — || September 17, 2004 || Anderson Mesa || LONEOS || — || align=right | 2.3 km || 
|-id=300 bgcolor=#fefefe
| 157300 ||  || — || September 17, 2004 || Anderson Mesa || LONEOS || — || align=right | 1.3 km || 
|}

157301–157400 

|-bgcolor=#E9E9E9
| 157301 Loreena ||  ||  || September 16, 2004 || Drebach || A. Knöfel || — || align=right | 2.1 km || 
|-id=302 bgcolor=#E9E9E9
| 157302 ||  || — || September 16, 2004 || Kitt Peak || Spacewatch || HEN || align=right | 1.5 km || 
|-id=303 bgcolor=#E9E9E9
| 157303 ||  || — || September 17, 2004 || Socorro || LINEAR || — || align=right | 3.1 km || 
|-id=304 bgcolor=#E9E9E9
| 157304 ||  || — || September 20, 2004 || Goodricke-Pigott || R. A. Tucker || — || align=right | 2.0 km || 
|-id=305 bgcolor=#fefefe
| 157305 ||  || — || September 17, 2004 || Kitt Peak || Spacewatch || NYS || align=right data-sort-value="0.91" | 910 m || 
|-id=306 bgcolor=#d6d6d6
| 157306 ||  || — || September 16, 2004 || Kitt Peak || Spacewatch || KOR || align=right | 1.7 km || 
|-id=307 bgcolor=#E9E9E9
| 157307 ||  || — || September 17, 2004 || Socorro || LINEAR || — || align=right | 1.4 km || 
|-id=308 bgcolor=#E9E9E9
| 157308 ||  || — || September 17, 2004 || Socorro || LINEAR || — || align=right | 2.2 km || 
|-id=309 bgcolor=#E9E9E9
| 157309 ||  || — || September 17, 2004 || Socorro || LINEAR || — || align=right | 1.8 km || 
|-id=310 bgcolor=#E9E9E9
| 157310 ||  || — || September 17, 2004 || Socorro || LINEAR || HEN || align=right | 1.9 km || 
|-id=311 bgcolor=#E9E9E9
| 157311 ||  || — || September 17, 2004 || Socorro || LINEAR || — || align=right | 3.1 km || 
|-id=312 bgcolor=#E9E9E9
| 157312 ||  || — || September 17, 2004 || Socorro || LINEAR || slow || align=right | 3.9 km || 
|-id=313 bgcolor=#E9E9E9
| 157313 ||  || — || September 17, 2004 || Socorro || LINEAR || — || align=right | 1.6 km || 
|-id=314 bgcolor=#d6d6d6
| 157314 ||  || — || September 17, 2004 || Kitt Peak || Spacewatch || — || align=right | 3.9 km || 
|-id=315 bgcolor=#d6d6d6
| 157315 ||  || — || September 17, 2004 || Socorro || LINEAR || THM || align=right | 4.1 km || 
|-id=316 bgcolor=#E9E9E9
| 157316 ||  || — || September 17, 2004 || Kitt Peak || Spacewatch || — || align=right | 1.5 km || 
|-id=317 bgcolor=#E9E9E9
| 157317 ||  || — || September 18, 2004 || Socorro || LINEAR || — || align=right | 1.6 km || 
|-id=318 bgcolor=#E9E9E9
| 157318 ||  || — || September 18, 2004 || Socorro || LINEAR || — || align=right | 2.4 km || 
|-id=319 bgcolor=#E9E9E9
| 157319 ||  || — || September 18, 2004 || Socorro || LINEAR || — || align=right | 3.4 km || 
|-id=320 bgcolor=#d6d6d6
| 157320 ||  || — || September 21, 2004 || Socorro || LINEAR || KOR || align=right | 2.0 km || 
|-id=321 bgcolor=#E9E9E9
| 157321 ||  || — || September 18, 2004 || Socorro || LINEAR || — || align=right | 3.0 km || 
|-id=322 bgcolor=#d6d6d6
| 157322 ||  || — || September 22, 2004 || Socorro || LINEAR || URS || align=right | 5.6 km || 
|-id=323 bgcolor=#E9E9E9
| 157323 ||  || — || September 16, 2004 || Anderson Mesa || LONEOS || EUN || align=right | 2.4 km || 
|-id=324 bgcolor=#E9E9E9
| 157324 ||  || — || October 2, 2004 || Palomar || NEAT || MAR || align=right | 1.9 km || 
|-id=325 bgcolor=#d6d6d6
| 157325 ||  || — || October 5, 2004 || Socorro || LINEAR || EOS || align=right | 3.8 km || 
|-id=326 bgcolor=#d6d6d6
| 157326 ||  || — || October 5, 2004 || Socorro || LINEAR || URS || align=right | 6.2 km || 
|-id=327 bgcolor=#d6d6d6
| 157327 ||  || — || October 4, 2004 || Kitt Peak || Spacewatch || KOR || align=right | 2.0 km || 
|-id=328 bgcolor=#d6d6d6
| 157328 ||  || — || October 5, 2004 || Anderson Mesa || LONEOS || — || align=right | 5.4 km || 
|-id=329 bgcolor=#E9E9E9
| 157329 ||  || — || October 13, 2004 || Trois-Rivières || É. J. Allen || AER || align=right | 5.9 km || 
|-id=330 bgcolor=#E9E9E9
| 157330 ||  || — || October 13, 2004 || Sonoita || W. R. Cooney Jr., J. Gross || AGN || align=right | 1.3 km || 
|-id=331 bgcolor=#E9E9E9
| 157331 ||  || — || October 11, 2004 || Kitt Peak || Spacewatch || GEF || align=right | 2.4 km || 
|-id=332 bgcolor=#E9E9E9
| 157332 Lynette ||  ||  || October 15, 2004 || Needville || D. Wells || — || align=right | 1.7 km || 
|-id=333 bgcolor=#E9E9E9
| 157333 ||  || — || October 3, 2004 || Palomar || NEAT || MAR || align=right | 1.4 km || 
|-id=334 bgcolor=#E9E9E9
| 157334 ||  || — || October 4, 2004 || Kitt Peak || Spacewatch || WIT || align=right | 1.4 km || 
|-id=335 bgcolor=#E9E9E9
| 157335 ||  || — || October 4, 2004 || Kitt Peak || Spacewatch || — || align=right | 2.6 km || 
|-id=336 bgcolor=#d6d6d6
| 157336 ||  || — || October 4, 2004 || Kitt Peak || Spacewatch || — || align=right | 3.8 km || 
|-id=337 bgcolor=#E9E9E9
| 157337 ||  || — || October 4, 2004 || Kitt Peak || Spacewatch || — || align=right | 1.5 km || 
|-id=338 bgcolor=#d6d6d6
| 157338 ||  || — || October 4, 2004 || Kitt Peak || Spacewatch || — || align=right | 3.8 km || 
|-id=339 bgcolor=#d6d6d6
| 157339 ||  || — || October 4, 2004 || Kitt Peak || Spacewatch || — || align=right | 3.2 km || 
|-id=340 bgcolor=#d6d6d6
| 157340 ||  || — || October 4, 2004 || Kitt Peak || Spacewatch || — || align=right | 5.2 km || 
|-id=341 bgcolor=#d6d6d6
| 157341 ||  || — || October 4, 2004 || Kitt Peak || Spacewatch || — || align=right | 3.6 km || 
|-id=342 bgcolor=#d6d6d6
| 157342 ||  || — || October 4, 2004 || Kitt Peak || Spacewatch || KOR || align=right | 2.2 km || 
|-id=343 bgcolor=#E9E9E9
| 157343 ||  || — || October 5, 2004 || Anderson Mesa || LONEOS || NEM || align=right | 3.4 km || 
|-id=344 bgcolor=#d6d6d6
| 157344 ||  || — || October 5, 2004 || Kitt Peak || Spacewatch || — || align=right | 4.3 km || 
|-id=345 bgcolor=#E9E9E9
| 157345 ||  || — || October 5, 2004 || Anderson Mesa || LONEOS || — || align=right | 2.5 km || 
|-id=346 bgcolor=#d6d6d6
| 157346 ||  || — || October 5, 2004 || Anderson Mesa || LONEOS || — || align=right | 4.3 km || 
|-id=347 bgcolor=#d6d6d6
| 157347 ||  || — || October 5, 2004 || Anderson Mesa || LONEOS || EOS || align=right | 3.5 km || 
|-id=348 bgcolor=#d6d6d6
| 157348 ||  || — || October 5, 2004 || Anderson Mesa || LONEOS || — || align=right | 5.9 km || 
|-id=349 bgcolor=#E9E9E9
| 157349 ||  || — || October 5, 2004 || Anderson Mesa || LONEOS || — || align=right | 2.6 km || 
|-id=350 bgcolor=#d6d6d6
| 157350 ||  || — || October 5, 2004 || Anderson Mesa || LONEOS || EOS || align=right | 3.8 km || 
|-id=351 bgcolor=#E9E9E9
| 157351 ||  || — || October 5, 2004 || Anderson Mesa || LONEOS || — || align=right | 2.5 km || 
|-id=352 bgcolor=#E9E9E9
| 157352 ||  || — || October 6, 2004 || Palomar || NEAT || — || align=right | 4.1 km || 
|-id=353 bgcolor=#E9E9E9
| 157353 ||  || — || October 6, 2004 || Palomar || NEAT || GEF || align=right | 2.2 km || 
|-id=354 bgcolor=#d6d6d6
| 157354 ||  || — || October 5, 2004 || Kitt Peak || Spacewatch || — || align=right | 4.3 km || 
|-id=355 bgcolor=#E9E9E9
| 157355 ||  || — || October 5, 2004 || Kitt Peak || Spacewatch || — || align=right | 1.7 km || 
|-id=356 bgcolor=#d6d6d6
| 157356 ||  || — || October 5, 2004 || Kitt Peak || Spacewatch || — || align=right | 3.9 km || 
|-id=357 bgcolor=#E9E9E9
| 157357 ||  || — || October 5, 2004 || Kitt Peak || Spacewatch || AGN || align=right | 2.1 km || 
|-id=358 bgcolor=#d6d6d6
| 157358 ||  || — || October 7, 2004 || Socorro || LINEAR || — || align=right | 3.4 km || 
|-id=359 bgcolor=#E9E9E9
| 157359 ||  || — || October 7, 2004 || Socorro || LINEAR || — || align=right | 3.5 km || 
|-id=360 bgcolor=#d6d6d6
| 157360 ||  || — || October 7, 2004 || Socorro || LINEAR || — || align=right | 3.3 km || 
|-id=361 bgcolor=#E9E9E9
| 157361 ||  || — || October 7, 2004 || Anderson Mesa || LONEOS || — || align=right | 1.6 km || 
|-id=362 bgcolor=#d6d6d6
| 157362 ||  || — || October 7, 2004 || Palomar || NEAT || KOR || align=right | 2.3 km || 
|-id=363 bgcolor=#E9E9E9
| 157363 ||  || — || October 7, 2004 || Palomar || NEAT || — || align=right | 4.4 km || 
|-id=364 bgcolor=#d6d6d6
| 157364 ||  || — || October 8, 2004 || Kitt Peak || Spacewatch || — || align=right | 4.1 km || 
|-id=365 bgcolor=#d6d6d6
| 157365 ||  || — || October 5, 2004 || Palomar || NEAT || — || align=right | 5.8 km || 
|-id=366 bgcolor=#E9E9E9
| 157366 ||  || — || October 6, 2004 || Palomar || NEAT || ADE || align=right | 5.4 km || 
|-id=367 bgcolor=#d6d6d6
| 157367 ||  || — || October 7, 2004 || Socorro || LINEAR || KOR || align=right | 2.1 km || 
|-id=368 bgcolor=#d6d6d6
| 157368 ||  || — || October 7, 2004 || Socorro || LINEAR || HYG || align=right | 4.5 km || 
|-id=369 bgcolor=#E9E9E9
| 157369 ||  || — || October 7, 2004 || Socorro || LINEAR || — || align=right | 3.4 km || 
|-id=370 bgcolor=#E9E9E9
| 157370 ||  || — || October 7, 2004 || Socorro || LINEAR || AGN || align=right | 1.7 km || 
|-id=371 bgcolor=#E9E9E9
| 157371 ||  || — || October 7, 2004 || Socorro || LINEAR || — || align=right | 1.9 km || 
|-id=372 bgcolor=#fefefe
| 157372 ||  || — || October 8, 2004 || Anderson Mesa || LONEOS || NYS || align=right data-sort-value="0.88" | 880 m || 
|-id=373 bgcolor=#E9E9E9
| 157373 ||  || — || October 8, 2004 || Anderson Mesa || LONEOS || WIT || align=right | 1.6 km || 
|-id=374 bgcolor=#d6d6d6
| 157374 ||  || — || October 9, 2004 || Anderson Mesa || LONEOS || — || align=right | 5.0 km || 
|-id=375 bgcolor=#d6d6d6
| 157375 ||  || — || October 4, 2004 || Kitt Peak || Spacewatch || SHU3:2 || align=right | 9.2 km || 
|-id=376 bgcolor=#d6d6d6
| 157376 ||  || — || October 6, 2004 || Kitt Peak || Spacewatch || — || align=right | 3.2 km || 
|-id=377 bgcolor=#d6d6d6
| 157377 ||  || — || October 6, 2004 || Kitt Peak || Spacewatch || — || align=right | 5.6 km || 
|-id=378 bgcolor=#E9E9E9
| 157378 ||  || — || October 6, 2004 || Kitt Peak || Spacewatch || AST || align=right | 5.0 km || 
|-id=379 bgcolor=#E9E9E9
| 157379 ||  || — || October 6, 2004 || Kitt Peak || Spacewatch || — || align=right | 3.0 km || 
|-id=380 bgcolor=#d6d6d6
| 157380 ||  || — || October 7, 2004 || Socorro || LINEAR || KOR || align=right | 2.5 km || 
|-id=381 bgcolor=#E9E9E9
| 157381 ||  || — || October 7, 2004 || Socorro || LINEAR || — || align=right | 1.7 km || 
|-id=382 bgcolor=#E9E9E9
| 157382 ||  || — || October 7, 2004 || Socorro || LINEAR || — || align=right | 2.6 km || 
|-id=383 bgcolor=#E9E9E9
| 157383 ||  || — || October 7, 2004 || Socorro || LINEAR || — || align=right | 4.7 km || 
|-id=384 bgcolor=#E9E9E9
| 157384 ||  || — || October 8, 2004 || Socorro || LINEAR || — || align=right | 3.4 km || 
|-id=385 bgcolor=#fefefe
| 157385 ||  || — || October 9, 2004 || Socorro || LINEAR || MAS || align=right | 1.00 km || 
|-id=386 bgcolor=#E9E9E9
| 157386 ||  || — || October 7, 2004 || Kitt Peak || Spacewatch || — || align=right | 3.4 km || 
|-id=387 bgcolor=#d6d6d6
| 157387 ||  || — || October 7, 2004 || Kitt Peak || Spacewatch || — || align=right | 4.4 km || 
|-id=388 bgcolor=#E9E9E9
| 157388 ||  || — || October 7, 2004 || Kitt Peak || Spacewatch || — || align=right | 2.0 km || 
|-id=389 bgcolor=#E9E9E9
| 157389 ||  || — || October 7, 2004 || Kitt Peak || Spacewatch || MRX || align=right | 1.8 km || 
|-id=390 bgcolor=#d6d6d6
| 157390 ||  || — || October 7, 2004 || Kitt Peak || Spacewatch || ANF || align=right | 2.9 km || 
|-id=391 bgcolor=#d6d6d6
| 157391 ||  || — || October 7, 2004 || Kitt Peak || Spacewatch || — || align=right | 5.5 km || 
|-id=392 bgcolor=#d6d6d6
| 157392 ||  || — || October 7, 2004 || Kitt Peak || Spacewatch || — || align=right | 3.2 km || 
|-id=393 bgcolor=#E9E9E9
| 157393 ||  || — || October 8, 2004 || Kitt Peak || Spacewatch || — || align=right | 1.8 km || 
|-id=394 bgcolor=#E9E9E9
| 157394 ||  || — || October 8, 2004 || Kitt Peak || Spacewatch || — || align=right | 4.0 km || 
|-id=395 bgcolor=#d6d6d6
| 157395 ||  || — || October 10, 2004 || Kitt Peak || Spacewatch || — || align=right | 3.6 km || 
|-id=396 bgcolor=#d6d6d6
| 157396 Vansevicius ||  ||  || October 13, 2004 || Moletai || K. Černis, J. Zdanavičius || — || align=right | 5.2 km || 
|-id=397 bgcolor=#d6d6d6
| 157397 ||  || — || October 7, 2004 || Socorro || LINEAR || KOR || align=right | 2.0 km || 
|-id=398 bgcolor=#d6d6d6
| 157398 ||  || — || October 7, 2004 || Socorro || LINEAR || — || align=right | 6.3 km || 
|-id=399 bgcolor=#d6d6d6
| 157399 ||  || — || October 8, 2004 || Kitt Peak || Spacewatch || — || align=right | 3.7 km || 
|-id=400 bgcolor=#E9E9E9
| 157400 ||  || — || October 9, 2004 || Kitt Peak || Spacewatch || — || align=right | 4.3 km || 
|}

157401–157500 

|-bgcolor=#d6d6d6
| 157401 ||  || — || October 10, 2004 || Socorro || LINEAR || ALA || align=right | 8.3 km || 
|-id=402 bgcolor=#d6d6d6
| 157402 ||  || — || October 10, 2004 || Socorro || LINEAR || — || align=right | 4.0 km || 
|-id=403 bgcolor=#d6d6d6
| 157403 ||  || — || October 6, 2004 || Socorro || LINEAR || EUP || align=right | 6.6 km || 
|-id=404 bgcolor=#d6d6d6
| 157404 ||  || — || October 7, 2004 || Kitt Peak || Spacewatch || HYG || align=right | 4.1 km || 
|-id=405 bgcolor=#E9E9E9
| 157405 ||  || — || October 7, 2004 || Socorro || LINEAR || — || align=right | 3.4 km || 
|-id=406 bgcolor=#d6d6d6
| 157406 ||  || — || October 7, 2004 || Kitt Peak || Spacewatch || — || align=right | 4.1 km || 
|-id=407 bgcolor=#E9E9E9
| 157407 ||  || — || October 7, 2004 || Palomar || NEAT || — || align=right | 2.9 km || 
|-id=408 bgcolor=#E9E9E9
| 157408 ||  || — || October 9, 2004 || Kitt Peak || Spacewatch || — || align=right | 1.1 km || 
|-id=409 bgcolor=#d6d6d6
| 157409 ||  || — || October 9, 2004 || Socorro || LINEAR || — || align=right | 5.3 km || 
|-id=410 bgcolor=#d6d6d6
| 157410 ||  || — || October 9, 2004 || Kitt Peak || Spacewatch || — || align=right | 5.7 km || 
|-id=411 bgcolor=#d6d6d6
| 157411 ||  || — || October 9, 2004 || Kitt Peak || Spacewatch || — || align=right | 3.2 km || 
|-id=412 bgcolor=#d6d6d6
| 157412 ||  || — || October 9, 2004 || Kitt Peak || Spacewatch || KOR || align=right | 2.1 km || 
|-id=413 bgcolor=#d6d6d6
| 157413 ||  || — || October 10, 2004 || Socorro || LINEAR || — || align=right | 5.4 km || 
|-id=414 bgcolor=#d6d6d6
| 157414 ||  || — || October 8, 2004 || Socorro || LINEAR || — || align=right | 5.3 km || 
|-id=415 bgcolor=#E9E9E9
| 157415 ||  || — || October 8, 2004 || Kitt Peak || Spacewatch || — || align=right | 1.6 km || 
|-id=416 bgcolor=#d6d6d6
| 157416 ||  || — || October 8, 2004 || Kitt Peak || Spacewatch || — || align=right | 4.2 km || 
|-id=417 bgcolor=#d6d6d6
| 157417 ||  || — || October 10, 2004 || Kitt Peak || Spacewatch || HYG || align=right | 3.9 km || 
|-id=418 bgcolor=#d6d6d6
| 157418 ||  || — || October 10, 2004 || Kitt Peak || Spacewatch || — || align=right | 4.1 km || 
|-id=419 bgcolor=#d6d6d6
| 157419 ||  || — || October 10, 2004 || Kitt Peak || Spacewatch || VER || align=right | 4.9 km || 
|-id=420 bgcolor=#d6d6d6
| 157420 ||  || — || October 13, 2004 || Kitt Peak || Spacewatch || THM || align=right | 4.3 km || 
|-id=421 bgcolor=#E9E9E9
| 157421 Carolpercy ||  ||  || October 8, 2004 || Jarnac || T. Glinos, D. H. Levy, W. Levy || — || align=right | 1.1 km || 
|-id=422 bgcolor=#d6d6d6
| 157422 ||  || — || October 10, 2004 || Socorro || LINEAR || — || align=right | 5.0 km || 
|-id=423 bgcolor=#d6d6d6
| 157423 ||  || — || October 10, 2004 || Kitt Peak || Spacewatch || KOR || align=right | 1.9 km || 
|-id=424 bgcolor=#E9E9E9
| 157424 ||  || — || October 4, 2004 || Palomar || NEAT || — || align=right | 3.2 km || 
|-id=425 bgcolor=#E9E9E9
| 157425 ||  || — || October 4, 2004 || Palomar || NEAT || — || align=right | 1.4 km || 
|-id=426 bgcolor=#E9E9E9
| 157426 ||  || — || October 9, 2004 || Kitt Peak || Spacewatch || — || align=right | 1.5 km || 
|-id=427 bgcolor=#E9E9E9
| 157427 ||  || — || October 10, 2004 || Kitt Peak || Spacewatch || — || align=right | 1.1 km || 
|-id=428 bgcolor=#E9E9E9
| 157428 ||  || — || October 10, 2004 || Kitt Peak || Spacewatch || AST || align=right | 2.5 km || 
|-id=429 bgcolor=#d6d6d6
| 157429 ||  || — || October 13, 2004 || Kitt Peak || Spacewatch || — || align=right | 3.7 km || 
|-id=430 bgcolor=#d6d6d6
| 157430 ||  || — || October 13, 2004 || Kitt Peak || Spacewatch || THM || align=right | 3.9 km || 
|-id=431 bgcolor=#d6d6d6
| 157431 ||  || — || October 13, 2004 || Kitt Peak || Spacewatch || — || align=right | 5.6 km || 
|-id=432 bgcolor=#d6d6d6
| 157432 ||  || — || October 15, 2004 || Mount Lemmon || Mount Lemmon Survey || HYG || align=right | 4.7 km || 
|-id=433 bgcolor=#E9E9E9
| 157433 ||  || — || October 14, 2004 || Anderson Mesa || LONEOS || — || align=right | 5.2 km || 
|-id=434 bgcolor=#d6d6d6
| 157434 ||  || — || October 5, 2004 || Kitt Peak || Spacewatch || — || align=right | 4.4 km || 
|-id=435 bgcolor=#d6d6d6
| 157435 ||  || — || October 13, 2004 || Kitt Peak || Spacewatch || — || align=right | 4.2 km || 
|-id=436 bgcolor=#d6d6d6
| 157436 ||  || — || October 18, 2004 || Socorro || LINEAR || — || align=right | 3.2 km || 
|-id=437 bgcolor=#d6d6d6
| 157437 ||  || — || November 3, 2004 || Kitt Peak || Spacewatch || URS || align=right | 5.8 km || 
|-id=438 bgcolor=#d6d6d6
| 157438 ||  || — || November 3, 2004 || Anderson Mesa || LONEOS || — || align=right | 5.8 km || 
|-id=439 bgcolor=#E9E9E9
| 157439 ||  || — || November 3, 2004 || Kitt Peak || Spacewatch || — || align=right | 3.7 km || 
|-id=440 bgcolor=#E9E9E9
| 157440 ||  || — || November 3, 2004 || Anderson Mesa || LONEOS || — || align=right | 1.7 km || 
|-id=441 bgcolor=#E9E9E9
| 157441 ||  || — || November 3, 2004 || Palomar || NEAT || AST || align=right | 4.1 km || 
|-id=442 bgcolor=#E9E9E9
| 157442 ||  || — || November 4, 2004 || Kitt Peak || Spacewatch || — || align=right | 4.4 km || 
|-id=443 bgcolor=#d6d6d6
| 157443 ||  || — || November 3, 2004 || Kitt Peak || Spacewatch || — || align=right | 3.9 km || 
|-id=444 bgcolor=#E9E9E9
| 157444 ||  || — || November 3, 2004 || Palomar || NEAT || — || align=right | 4.6 km || 
|-id=445 bgcolor=#E9E9E9
| 157445 ||  || — || November 4, 2004 || Catalina || CSS || — || align=right | 1.6 km || 
|-id=446 bgcolor=#d6d6d6
| 157446 ||  || — || November 5, 2004 || Palomar || NEAT || — || align=right | 5.2 km || 
|-id=447 bgcolor=#E9E9E9
| 157447 ||  || — || November 5, 2004 || Palomar || NEAT || — || align=right | 4.1 km || 
|-id=448 bgcolor=#d6d6d6
| 157448 ||  || — || November 4, 2004 || Kitt Peak || Spacewatch || — || align=right | 3.5 km || 
|-id=449 bgcolor=#d6d6d6
| 157449 ||  || — || November 4, 2004 || Catalina || CSS || — || align=right | 6.0 km || 
|-id=450 bgcolor=#d6d6d6
| 157450 ||  || — || November 5, 2004 || Palomar || NEAT || — || align=right | 5.2 km || 
|-id=451 bgcolor=#d6d6d6
| 157451 ||  || — || November 7, 2004 || Socorro || LINEAR || — || align=right | 4.8 km || 
|-id=452 bgcolor=#d6d6d6
| 157452 ||  || — || November 10, 2004 || Kitt Peak || Spacewatch || — || align=right | 3.3 km || 
|-id=453 bgcolor=#d6d6d6
| 157453 ||  || — || November 4, 2004 || Anderson Mesa || LONEOS || — || align=right | 6.3 km || 
|-id=454 bgcolor=#d6d6d6
| 157454 ||  || — || November 3, 2004 || Kitt Peak || Spacewatch || THM || align=right | 3.3 km || 
|-id=455 bgcolor=#d6d6d6
| 157455 || 2004 WV || — || November 17, 2004 || Siding Spring || SSS || — || align=right | 5.3 km || 
|-id=456 bgcolor=#d6d6d6
| 157456 Pivatte ||  ||  || November 17, 2004 || Nogales || M. Ory || KOR || align=right | 1.9 km || 
|-id=457 bgcolor=#d6d6d6
| 157457 ||  || — || November 20, 2004 || Kitt Peak || Spacewatch || KOR || align=right | 2.5 km || 
|-id=458 bgcolor=#d6d6d6
| 157458 ||  || — || December 1, 2004 || Palomar || NEAT || EOS || align=right | 3.5 km || 
|-id=459 bgcolor=#d6d6d6
| 157459 ||  || — || December 8, 2004 || Socorro || LINEAR || — || align=right | 5.5 km || 
|-id=460 bgcolor=#d6d6d6
| 157460 ||  || — || December 10, 2004 || Socorro || LINEAR || — || align=right | 8.4 km || 
|-id=461 bgcolor=#d6d6d6
| 157461 ||  || — || December 10, 2004 || Socorro || LINEAR || — || align=right | 7.6 km || 
|-id=462 bgcolor=#d6d6d6
| 157462 ||  || — || December 7, 2004 || Socorro || LINEAR || — || align=right | 4.9 km || 
|-id=463 bgcolor=#d6d6d6
| 157463 ||  || — || December 10, 2004 || Socorro || LINEAR || VER || align=right | 5.1 km || 
|-id=464 bgcolor=#d6d6d6
| 157464 ||  || — || December 10, 2004 || Socorro || LINEAR || — || align=right | 4.8 km || 
|-id=465 bgcolor=#d6d6d6
| 157465 ||  || — || December 9, 2004 || Catalina || CSS || — || align=right | 4.3 km || 
|-id=466 bgcolor=#d6d6d6
| 157466 ||  || — || December 11, 2004 || Socorro || LINEAR || — || align=right | 7.5 km || 
|-id=467 bgcolor=#d6d6d6
| 157467 ||  || — || December 10, 2004 || Catalina || CSS || — || align=right | 5.2 km || 
|-id=468 bgcolor=#C2FFFF
| 157468 ||  || — || December 10, 2004 || Kitt Peak || Spacewatch || L5 || align=right | 13 km || 
|-id=469 bgcolor=#C2FFFF
| 157469 ||  || — || January 11, 2005 || Socorro || LINEAR || L5 || align=right | 18 km || 
|-id=470 bgcolor=#C2FFFF
| 157470 ||  || — || January 15, 2005 || Kitt Peak || Spacewatch || L5 || align=right | 12 km || 
|-id=471 bgcolor=#C2FFFF
| 157471 ||  || — || January 15, 2005 || Kitt Peak || Spacewatch || L5 || align=right | 10 km || 
|-id=472 bgcolor=#E9E9E9
| 157472 ||  || — || August 1, 2005 || Siding Spring || SSS || ADE || align=right | 4.7 km || 
|-id=473 bgcolor=#fefefe
| 157473 Emuno || 2005 QH ||  || August 23, 2005 || La Cañada || J. Lacruz || — || align=right | 1.3 km || 
|-id=474 bgcolor=#E9E9E9
| 157474 ||  || — || August 25, 2005 || Palomar || NEAT || — || align=right | 1.3 km || 
|-id=475 bgcolor=#fefefe
| 157475 ||  || — || August 27, 2005 || Kitt Peak || Spacewatch || NYS || align=right | 2.1 km || 
|-id=476 bgcolor=#fefefe
| 157476 ||  || — || August 25, 2005 || Palomar || NEAT || — || align=right | 1.3 km || 
|-id=477 bgcolor=#fefefe
| 157477 ||  || — || August 26, 2005 || Haleakala || NEAT || V || align=right | 1.1 km || 
|-id=478 bgcolor=#E9E9E9
| 157478 ||  || — || August 25, 2005 || Palomar || NEAT || DOR || align=right | 4.1 km || 
|-id=479 bgcolor=#fefefe
| 157479 ||  || — || August 29, 2005 || Socorro || LINEAR || — || align=right | 1.4 km || 
|-id=480 bgcolor=#E9E9E9
| 157480 ||  || — || August 29, 2005 || Socorro || LINEAR || IAN || align=right | 1.5 km || 
|-id=481 bgcolor=#fefefe
| 157481 ||  || — || August 25, 2005 || Palomar || NEAT || NYS || align=right data-sort-value="0.89" | 890 m || 
|-id=482 bgcolor=#fefefe
| 157482 ||  || — || August 29, 2005 || Socorro || LINEAR || FLO || align=right | 1.0 km || 
|-id=483 bgcolor=#fefefe
| 157483 ||  || — || August 27, 2005 || Palomar || NEAT || FLO || align=right | 1.4 km || 
|-id=484 bgcolor=#E9E9E9
| 157484 ||  || — || August 28, 2005 || Kitt Peak || Spacewatch || — || align=right data-sort-value="0.94" | 940 m || 
|-id=485 bgcolor=#E9E9E9
| 157485 ||  || — || August 28, 2005 || Kitt Peak || Spacewatch || — || align=right | 1.2 km || 
|-id=486 bgcolor=#fefefe
| 157486 ||  || — || August 28, 2005 || Kitt Peak || Spacewatch || — || align=right data-sort-value="0.95" | 950 m || 
|-id=487 bgcolor=#E9E9E9
| 157487 ||  || — || August 31, 2005 || Anderson Mesa || LONEOS || EUN || align=right | 1.6 km || 
|-id=488 bgcolor=#fefefe
| 157488 ||  || — || August 31, 2005 || Kitt Peak || Spacewatch || — || align=right | 1.3 km || 
|-id=489 bgcolor=#fefefe
| 157489 ||  || — || August 31, 2005 || Palomar || NEAT || NYS || align=right data-sort-value="0.95" | 950 m || 
|-id=490 bgcolor=#fefefe
| 157490 ||  || — || September 8, 2005 || Socorro || LINEAR || NYS || align=right | 2.7 km || 
|-id=491 bgcolor=#d6d6d6
| 157491 Rüdigerkollar ||  ||  || September 8, 2005 || Radebeul || M. Fiedler || — || align=right | 2.6 km || 
|-id=492 bgcolor=#fefefe
| 157492 ||  || — || September 6, 2005 || Catalina || CSS || — || align=right | 1.4 km || 
|-id=493 bgcolor=#fefefe
| 157493 ||  || — || September 8, 2005 || Socorro || LINEAR || MAS || align=right data-sort-value="0.88" | 880 m || 
|-id=494 bgcolor=#E9E9E9
| 157494 Durham ||  ||  || September 11, 2005 || Jarnac || Jarnac Obs. || — || align=right | 2.8 km || 
|-id=495 bgcolor=#fefefe
| 157495 ||  || — || September 23, 2005 || Anderson Mesa || LONEOS || — || align=right data-sort-value="0.92" | 920 m || 
|-id=496 bgcolor=#fefefe
| 157496 ||  || — || September 23, 2005 || Catalina || CSS || NYS || align=right | 1.0 km || 
|-id=497 bgcolor=#E9E9E9
| 157497 ||  || — || September 25, 2005 || Palomar || NEAT || JUN || align=right | 1.4 km || 
|-id=498 bgcolor=#fefefe
| 157498 ||  || — || September 24, 2005 || Kitt Peak || Spacewatch || MAS || align=right | 1.1 km || 
|-id=499 bgcolor=#fefefe
| 157499 ||  || — || September 23, 2005 || Kitt Peak || Spacewatch || — || align=right | 1.2 km || 
|-id=500 bgcolor=#fefefe
| 157500 ||  || — || September 25, 2005 || Palomar || NEAT || — || align=right | 1.1 km || 
|}

157501–157600 

|-bgcolor=#fefefe
| 157501 ||  || — || September 24, 2005 || Anderson Mesa || LONEOS || FLO || align=right data-sort-value="0.93" | 930 m || 
|-id=502 bgcolor=#E9E9E9
| 157502 ||  || — || September 23, 2005 || Kitt Peak || Spacewatch || — || align=right | 1.7 km || 
|-id=503 bgcolor=#fefefe
| 157503 ||  || — || September 24, 2005 || Kitt Peak || Spacewatch || — || align=right data-sort-value="0.85" | 850 m || 
|-id=504 bgcolor=#fefefe
| 157504 ||  || — || September 24, 2005 || Kitt Peak || Spacewatch || NYS || align=right data-sort-value="0.89" | 890 m || 
|-id=505 bgcolor=#fefefe
| 157505 ||  || — || September 24, 2005 || Kitt Peak || Spacewatch || V || align=right | 1.1 km || 
|-id=506 bgcolor=#fefefe
| 157506 ||  || — || September 25, 2005 || Catalina || CSS || NYS || align=right data-sort-value="0.84" | 840 m || 
|-id=507 bgcolor=#fefefe
| 157507 ||  || — || September 26, 2005 || Kitt Peak || Spacewatch || — || align=right data-sort-value="0.89" | 890 m || 
|-id=508 bgcolor=#fefefe
| 157508 ||  || — || September 23, 2005 || Kitt Peak || Spacewatch || — || align=right | 1.2 km || 
|-id=509 bgcolor=#fefefe
| 157509 ||  || — || September 23, 2005 || Kitt Peak || Spacewatch || NYS || align=right | 1.0 km || 
|-id=510 bgcolor=#d6d6d6
| 157510 ||  || — || September 24, 2005 || Kitt Peak || Spacewatch || THM || align=right | 2.9 km || 
|-id=511 bgcolor=#fefefe
| 157511 ||  || — || September 24, 2005 || Kitt Peak || Spacewatch || — || align=right data-sort-value="0.88" | 880 m || 
|-id=512 bgcolor=#E9E9E9
| 157512 ||  || — || September 24, 2005 || Kitt Peak || Spacewatch || EUN || align=right | 1.7 km || 
|-id=513 bgcolor=#fefefe
| 157513 ||  || — || September 25, 2005 || Palomar || NEAT || — || align=right | 1.3 km || 
|-id=514 bgcolor=#fefefe
| 157514 ||  || — || September 25, 2005 || Kitt Peak || Spacewatch || V || align=right | 1.1 km || 
|-id=515 bgcolor=#E9E9E9
| 157515 ||  || — || September 25, 2005 || Palomar || NEAT || — || align=right | 6.3 km || 
|-id=516 bgcolor=#fefefe
| 157516 ||  || — || September 29, 2005 || Kitt Peak || Spacewatch || — || align=right | 1.4 km || 
|-id=517 bgcolor=#fefefe
| 157517 ||  || — || September 25, 2005 || Kitt Peak || Spacewatch || NYS || align=right data-sort-value="0.73" | 730 m || 
|-id=518 bgcolor=#E9E9E9
| 157518 ||  || — || September 25, 2005 || Kitt Peak || Spacewatch || — || align=right | 1.3 km || 
|-id=519 bgcolor=#fefefe
| 157519 ||  || — || September 26, 2005 || Kitt Peak || Spacewatch || — || align=right data-sort-value="0.94" | 940 m || 
|-id=520 bgcolor=#fefefe
| 157520 ||  || — || September 26, 2005 || Kitt Peak || Spacewatch || NYS || align=right | 2.3 km || 
|-id=521 bgcolor=#fefefe
| 157521 ||  || — || September 27, 2005 || Kitt Peak || Spacewatch || MAS || align=right | 1.0 km || 
|-id=522 bgcolor=#fefefe
| 157522 ||  || — || September 29, 2005 || Anderson Mesa || LONEOS || — || align=right | 1.2 km || 
|-id=523 bgcolor=#fefefe
| 157523 ||  || — || September 29, 2005 || Kitt Peak || Spacewatch || FLO || align=right | 1.1 km || 
|-id=524 bgcolor=#fefefe
| 157524 ||  || — || September 29, 2005 || Anderson Mesa || LONEOS || EUT || align=right data-sort-value="0.99" | 990 m || 
|-id=525 bgcolor=#E9E9E9
| 157525 ||  || — || September 29, 2005 || Anderson Mesa || LONEOS || — || align=right | 3.3 km || 
|-id=526 bgcolor=#E9E9E9
| 157526 ||  || — || September 30, 2005 || Catalina || CSS || ADE || align=right | 2.5 km || 
|-id=527 bgcolor=#fefefe
| 157527 ||  || — || September 28, 2005 || Palomar || NEAT || MAS || align=right data-sort-value="0.78" | 780 m || 
|-id=528 bgcolor=#fefefe
| 157528 ||  || — || September 30, 2005 || Anderson Mesa || LONEOS || H || align=right | 1.1 km || 
|-id=529 bgcolor=#E9E9E9
| 157529 ||  || — || October 1, 2005 || Mount Lemmon || Mount Lemmon Survey || — || align=right | 3.0 km || 
|-id=530 bgcolor=#fefefe
| 157530 ||  || — || October 1, 2005 || Socorro || LINEAR || NYS || align=right | 1.6 km || 
|-id=531 bgcolor=#fefefe
| 157531 ||  || — || October 1, 2005 || Mount Lemmon || Mount Lemmon Survey || NYS || align=right | 2.4 km || 
|-id=532 bgcolor=#E9E9E9
| 157532 ||  || — || October 1, 2005 || Kitt Peak || Spacewatch || — || align=right | 3.2 km || 
|-id=533 bgcolor=#E9E9E9
| 157533 Stellamarie ||  ||  || October 10, 2005 || Altschwendt || W. Ries || — || align=right | 1.9 km || 
|-id=534 bgcolor=#fefefe
| 157534 Siauliai ||  ||  || October 8, 2005 || Moletai || K. Černis, J. Zdanavičius || V || align=right data-sort-value="0.85" | 850 m || 
|-id=535 bgcolor=#E9E9E9
| 157535 ||  || — || October 1, 2005 || Socorro || LINEAR || — || align=right | 2.9 km || 
|-id=536 bgcolor=#fefefe
| 157536 ||  || — || October 4, 2005 || Mount Lemmon || Mount Lemmon Survey || FLO || align=right | 1.1 km || 
|-id=537 bgcolor=#fefefe
| 157537 ||  || — || October 7, 2005 || Kitt Peak || Spacewatch || — || align=right | 1.0 km || 
|-id=538 bgcolor=#d6d6d6
| 157538 ||  || — || October 7, 2005 || Kitt Peak || Spacewatch || — || align=right | 5.8 km || 
|-id=539 bgcolor=#E9E9E9
| 157539 ||  || — || October 1, 2005 || Kitt Peak || Spacewatch || — || align=right | 2.2 km || 
|-id=540 bgcolor=#fefefe
| 157540 ||  || — || October 25, 2005 || Junk Bond || D. Healy || FLO || align=right | 1.2 km || 
|-id=541 bgcolor=#fefefe
| 157541 Wachter ||  ||  || October 27, 2005 || Ottmarsheim || C. Rinner || — || align=right | 1.6 km || 
|-id=542 bgcolor=#fefefe
| 157542 ||  || — || October 22, 2005 || Kitt Peak || Spacewatch || — || align=right | 1.5 km || 
|-id=543 bgcolor=#fefefe
| 157543 ||  || — || October 22, 2005 || Kitt Peak || Spacewatch || — || align=right | 2.4 km || 
|-id=544 bgcolor=#E9E9E9
| 157544 ||  || — || October 22, 2005 || Kitt Peak || Spacewatch || — || align=right | 2.4 km || 
|-id=545 bgcolor=#fefefe
| 157545 ||  || — || October 22, 2005 || Kitt Peak || Spacewatch || NYS || align=right data-sort-value="0.93" | 930 m || 
|-id=546 bgcolor=#fefefe
| 157546 ||  || — || October 23, 2005 || Kitt Peak || Spacewatch || — || align=right | 2.0 km || 
|-id=547 bgcolor=#fefefe
| 157547 ||  || — || October 23, 2005 || Catalina || CSS || — || align=right | 1.2 km || 
|-id=548 bgcolor=#E9E9E9
| 157548 ||  || — || October 21, 2005 || Palomar || NEAT || — || align=right | 1.1 km || 
|-id=549 bgcolor=#fefefe
| 157549 ||  || — || October 23, 2005 || Catalina || CSS || V || align=right | 1.2 km || 
|-id=550 bgcolor=#fefefe
| 157550 ||  || — || October 25, 2005 || Kitt Peak || Spacewatch || — || align=right data-sort-value="0.93" | 930 m || 
|-id=551 bgcolor=#fefefe
| 157551 ||  || — || October 22, 2005 || Kitt Peak || Spacewatch || NYS || align=right | 1.0 km || 
|-id=552 bgcolor=#d6d6d6
| 157552 ||  || — || October 23, 2005 || Catalina || CSS || EOS || align=right | 2.9 km || 
|-id=553 bgcolor=#fefefe
| 157553 ||  || — || October 23, 2005 || Palomar || NEAT || — || align=right | 1.3 km || 
|-id=554 bgcolor=#fefefe
| 157554 ||  || — || October 25, 2005 || Catalina || CSS || — || align=right | 1.1 km || 
|-id=555 bgcolor=#fefefe
| 157555 ||  || — || October 20, 2005 || Palomar || NEAT || — || align=right | 1.3 km || 
|-id=556 bgcolor=#E9E9E9
| 157556 ||  || — || October 22, 2005 || Kitt Peak || Spacewatch || — || align=right | 1.6 km || 
|-id=557 bgcolor=#E9E9E9
| 157557 ||  || — || October 22, 2005 || Kitt Peak || Spacewatch || — || align=right | 2.2 km || 
|-id=558 bgcolor=#E9E9E9
| 157558 ||  || — || October 22, 2005 || Kitt Peak || Spacewatch || — || align=right | 1.2 km || 
|-id=559 bgcolor=#E9E9E9
| 157559 ||  || — || October 22, 2005 || Kitt Peak || Spacewatch || — || align=right | 2.6 km || 
|-id=560 bgcolor=#fefefe
| 157560 ||  || — || October 22, 2005 || Kitt Peak || Spacewatch || NYS || align=right | 2.0 km || 
|-id=561 bgcolor=#fefefe
| 157561 ||  || — || October 24, 2005 || Kitt Peak || Spacewatch || — || align=right | 1.1 km || 
|-id=562 bgcolor=#fefefe
| 157562 ||  || — || October 24, 2005 || Anderson Mesa || LONEOS || — || align=right | 2.8 km || 
|-id=563 bgcolor=#E9E9E9
| 157563 ||  || — || October 24, 2005 || Palomar || NEAT || INO || align=right | 2.0 km || 
|-id=564 bgcolor=#fefefe
| 157564 ||  || — || October 24, 2005 || Palomar || NEAT || FLO || align=right | 1.2 km || 
|-id=565 bgcolor=#d6d6d6
| 157565 ||  || — || October 25, 2005 || Kitt Peak || Spacewatch || — || align=right | 5.0 km || 
|-id=566 bgcolor=#E9E9E9
| 157566 ||  || — || October 25, 2005 || Catalina || CSS || MAR || align=right | 2.7 km || 
|-id=567 bgcolor=#E9E9E9
| 157567 ||  || — || October 25, 2005 || Catalina || CSS || EUN || align=right | 2.1 km || 
|-id=568 bgcolor=#fefefe
| 157568 ||  || — || October 26, 2005 || Kitt Peak || Spacewatch || — || align=right | 1.1 km || 
|-id=569 bgcolor=#fefefe
| 157569 ||  || — || October 26, 2005 || Kitt Peak || Spacewatch || — || align=right | 2.3 km || 
|-id=570 bgcolor=#fefefe
| 157570 ||  || — || October 26, 2005 || Anderson Mesa || LONEOS || — || align=right | 1.2 km || 
|-id=571 bgcolor=#E9E9E9
| 157571 ||  || — || October 24, 2005 || Kitt Peak || Spacewatch || — || align=right | 1.9 km || 
|-id=572 bgcolor=#E9E9E9
| 157572 ||  || — || October 27, 2005 || Mount Lemmon || Mount Lemmon Survey || — || align=right | 1.4 km || 
|-id=573 bgcolor=#E9E9E9
| 157573 ||  || — || October 24, 2005 || Kitt Peak || Spacewatch || MIS || align=right | 2.5 km || 
|-id=574 bgcolor=#fefefe
| 157574 ||  || — || October 25, 2005 || Kitt Peak || Spacewatch || — || align=right | 1.1 km || 
|-id=575 bgcolor=#E9E9E9
| 157575 ||  || — || October 25, 2005 || Kitt Peak || Spacewatch || — || align=right | 4.2 km || 
|-id=576 bgcolor=#fefefe
| 157576 ||  || — || October 25, 2005 || Catalina || CSS || FLO || align=right data-sort-value="0.94" | 940 m || 
|-id=577 bgcolor=#fefefe
| 157577 ||  || — || October 25, 2005 || Kitt Peak || Spacewatch || NYS || align=right | 1.1 km || 
|-id=578 bgcolor=#fefefe
| 157578 ||  || — || October 22, 2005 || Kitt Peak || Spacewatch || NYS || align=right | 1.2 km || 
|-id=579 bgcolor=#E9E9E9
| 157579 ||  || — || October 24, 2005 || Palomar || NEAT || — || align=right | 2.4 km || 
|-id=580 bgcolor=#E9E9E9
| 157580 ||  || — || October 26, 2005 || Kitt Peak || Spacewatch || — || align=right | 1.3 km || 
|-id=581 bgcolor=#fefefe
| 157581 ||  || — || October 28, 2005 || Kitt Peak || Spacewatch || NYS || align=right data-sort-value="0.95" | 950 m || 
|-id=582 bgcolor=#E9E9E9
| 157582 ||  || — || October 27, 2005 || Kitt Peak || Spacewatch || GEF || align=right | 1.7 km || 
|-id=583 bgcolor=#fefefe
| 157583 ||  || — || October 30, 2005 || Palomar || NEAT || V || align=right | 1.1 km || 
|-id=584 bgcolor=#fefefe
| 157584 ||  || — || October 26, 2005 || Socorro || LINEAR || — || align=right | 2.4 km || 
|-id=585 bgcolor=#d6d6d6
| 157585 ||  || — || October 27, 2005 || Catalina || CSS || — || align=right | 3.8 km || 
|-id=586 bgcolor=#fefefe
| 157586 ||  || — || October 28, 2005 || Kitt Peak || Spacewatch || — || align=right data-sort-value="0.90" | 900 m || 
|-id=587 bgcolor=#fefefe
| 157587 ||  || — || October 29, 2005 || Catalina || CSS || — || align=right | 1.9 km || 
|-id=588 bgcolor=#E9E9E9
| 157588 ||  || — || October 29, 2005 || Palomar || NEAT || — || align=right | 3.5 km || 
|-id=589 bgcolor=#E9E9E9
| 157589 ||  || — || October 30, 2005 || Socorro || LINEAR || — || align=right | 2.8 km || 
|-id=590 bgcolor=#E9E9E9
| 157590 ||  || — || October 31, 2005 || Mount Lemmon || Mount Lemmon Survey || EUN || align=right | 2.5 km || 
|-id=591 bgcolor=#fefefe
| 157591 ||  || — || October 30, 2005 || Socorro || LINEAR || — || align=right | 1.5 km || 
|-id=592 bgcolor=#E9E9E9
| 157592 ||  || — || October 30, 2005 || Socorro || LINEAR || ADE || align=right | 3.0 km || 
|-id=593 bgcolor=#fefefe
| 157593 ||  || — || October 26, 2005 || Kitt Peak || Spacewatch || — || align=right | 1.2 km || 
|-id=594 bgcolor=#d6d6d6
| 157594 ||  || — || November 4, 2005 || Goodricke-Pigott || R. A. Tucker || — || align=right | 2.9 km || 
|-id=595 bgcolor=#E9E9E9
| 157595 ||  || — || November 1, 2005 || Kitt Peak || Spacewatch || MAR || align=right | 1.6 km || 
|-id=596 bgcolor=#fefefe
| 157596 ||  || — || November 3, 2005 || Socorro || LINEAR || — || align=right | 1.8 km || 
|-id=597 bgcolor=#fefefe
| 157597 ||  || — || November 3, 2005 || Mount Lemmon || Mount Lemmon Survey || — || align=right | 1.5 km || 
|-id=598 bgcolor=#E9E9E9
| 157598 ||  || — || November 1, 2005 || Mount Lemmon || Mount Lemmon Survey || — || align=right | 2.9 km || 
|-id=599 bgcolor=#E9E9E9
| 157599 ||  || — || November 6, 2005 || Mount Lemmon || Mount Lemmon Survey || — || align=right | 2.5 km || 
|-id=600 bgcolor=#fefefe
| 157600 ||  || — || November 7, 2005 || Socorro || LINEAR || V || align=right | 1.0 km || 
|}

157601–157700 

|-bgcolor=#E9E9E9
| 157601 ||  || — || November 20, 2005 || Palomar || NEAT || — || align=right | 2.5 km || 
|-id=602 bgcolor=#E9E9E9
| 157602 ||  || — || November 21, 2005 || Anderson Mesa || LONEOS || MAR || align=right | 1.8 km || 
|-id=603 bgcolor=#E9E9E9
| 157603 ||  || — || November 22, 2005 || Kitt Peak || Spacewatch || — || align=right | 1.1 km || 
|-id=604 bgcolor=#d6d6d6
| 157604 ||  || — || November 21, 2005 || Kitt Peak || Spacewatch || — || align=right | 5.0 km || 
|-id=605 bgcolor=#E9E9E9
| 157605 ||  || — || November 21, 2005 || Kitt Peak || Spacewatch || AEO || align=right | 1.6 km || 
|-id=606 bgcolor=#E9E9E9
| 157606 ||  || — || November 21, 2005 || Kitt Peak || Spacewatch || AGN || align=right | 2.0 km || 
|-id=607 bgcolor=#fefefe
| 157607 ||  || — || November 21, 2005 || Kitt Peak || Spacewatch || — || align=right | 2.6 km || 
|-id=608 bgcolor=#d6d6d6
| 157608 ||  || — || November 21, 2005 || Kitt Peak || Spacewatch || — || align=right | 5.7 km || 
|-id=609 bgcolor=#d6d6d6
| 157609 ||  || — || November 21, 2005 || Kitt Peak || Spacewatch || — || align=right | 3.7 km || 
|-id=610 bgcolor=#E9E9E9
| 157610 ||  || — || November 25, 2005 || Kitt Peak || Spacewatch || — || align=right | 1.8 km || 
|-id=611 bgcolor=#d6d6d6
| 157611 ||  || — || November 25, 2005 || Kitt Peak || Spacewatch || — || align=right | 5.0 km || 
|-id=612 bgcolor=#E9E9E9
| 157612 ||  || — || November 21, 2005 || Catalina || CSS || — || align=right | 2.1 km || 
|-id=613 bgcolor=#fefefe
| 157613 ||  || — || November 22, 2005 || Kitt Peak || Spacewatch || FLO || align=right data-sort-value="0.96" | 960 m || 
|-id=614 bgcolor=#E9E9E9
| 157614 ||  || — || November 25, 2005 || Kitt Peak || Spacewatch || — || align=right | 2.5 km || 
|-id=615 bgcolor=#E9E9E9
| 157615 ||  || — || November 25, 2005 || Catalina || CSS || — || align=right | 2.3 km || 
|-id=616 bgcolor=#d6d6d6
| 157616 ||  || — || November 26, 2005 || Catalina || CSS || — || align=right | 5.7 km || 
|-id=617 bgcolor=#d6d6d6
| 157617 ||  || — || November 25, 2005 || Kitt Peak || Spacewatch || KOR || align=right | 1.9 km || 
|-id=618 bgcolor=#E9E9E9
| 157618 ||  || — || November 26, 2005 || Mount Lemmon || Mount Lemmon Survey || — || align=right | 1.9 km || 
|-id=619 bgcolor=#fefefe
| 157619 ||  || — || November 25, 2005 || Mount Lemmon || Mount Lemmon Survey || — || align=right | 1.1 km || 
|-id=620 bgcolor=#E9E9E9
| 157620 ||  || — || November 26, 2005 || Kitt Peak || Spacewatch || — || align=right | 2.0 km || 
|-id=621 bgcolor=#d6d6d6
| 157621 ||  || — || November 29, 2005 || Socorro || LINEAR || — || align=right | 3.3 km || 
|-id=622 bgcolor=#E9E9E9
| 157622 ||  || — || November 29, 2005 || Socorro || LINEAR || — || align=right | 1.3 km || 
|-id=623 bgcolor=#E9E9E9
| 157623 ||  || — || November 29, 2005 || Catalina || CSS || — || align=right | 3.5 km || 
|-id=624 bgcolor=#fefefe
| 157624 ||  || — || November 29, 2005 || Catalina || CSS || — || align=right | 1.0 km || 
|-id=625 bgcolor=#E9E9E9
| 157625 ||  || — || November 30, 2005 || Mount Lemmon || Mount Lemmon Survey || — || align=right | 2.1 km || 
|-id=626 bgcolor=#E9E9E9
| 157626 ||  || — || November 30, 2005 || Kitt Peak || Spacewatch || — || align=right | 1.9 km || 
|-id=627 bgcolor=#d6d6d6
| 157627 ||  || — || November 28, 2005 || Kitt Peak || Spacewatch || — || align=right | 4.0 km || 
|-id=628 bgcolor=#fefefe
| 157628 ||  || — || November 28, 2005 || Catalina || CSS || — || align=right | 3.7 km || 
|-id=629 bgcolor=#fefefe
| 157629 ||  || — || November 29, 2005 || Kitt Peak || Spacewatch || NYS || align=right | 1.0 km || 
|-id=630 bgcolor=#d6d6d6
| 157630 ||  || — || November 26, 2005 || Mount Lemmon || Mount Lemmon Survey || — || align=right | 4.3 km || 
|-id=631 bgcolor=#d6d6d6
| 157631 ||  || — || November 28, 2005 || Palomar || NEAT || — || align=right | 4.5 km || 
|-id=632 bgcolor=#E9E9E9
| 157632 ||  || — || November 28, 2005 || Mount Lemmon || Mount Lemmon Survey || — || align=right | 2.1 km || 
|-id=633 bgcolor=#E9E9E9
| 157633 ||  || — || November 26, 2005 || Anderson Mesa || LONEOS || HNS || align=right | 1.7 km || 
|-id=634 bgcolor=#d6d6d6
| 157634 ||  || — || November 30, 2005 || Mount Lemmon || Mount Lemmon Survey || — || align=right | 3.1 km || 
|-id=635 bgcolor=#d6d6d6
| 157635 ||  || — || November 22, 2005 || Kitt Peak || Spacewatch || — || align=right | 3.1 km || 
|-id=636 bgcolor=#E9E9E9
| 157636 ||  || — || November 30, 2005 || Socorro || LINEAR || — || align=right | 3.0 km || 
|-id=637 bgcolor=#E9E9E9
| 157637 ||  || — || December 6, 2005 || Socorro || LINEAR || — || align=right | 4.5 km || 
|-id=638 bgcolor=#E9E9E9
| 157638 ||  || — || December 4, 2005 || Socorro || LINEAR || — || align=right | 2.9 km || 
|-id=639 bgcolor=#d6d6d6
| 157639 ||  || — || December 4, 2005 || Socorro || LINEAR || — || align=right | 3.5 km || 
|-id=640 bgcolor=#d6d6d6
| 157640 Baumeler ||  ||  || December 1, 2006 || Marly || P. Kocher || — || align=right | 5.8 km || 
|-id=641 bgcolor=#E9E9E9
| 157641 ||  || — || December 8, 2005 || Kitt Peak || Spacewatch || MIS || align=right | 3.4 km || 
|-id=642 bgcolor=#E9E9E9
| 157642 ||  || — || December 10, 2005 || Socorro || LINEAR || — || align=right | 2.5 km || 
|-id=643 bgcolor=#d6d6d6
| 157643 ||  || — || December 2, 2005 || Kitt Peak || Spacewatch || — || align=right | 4.3 km || 
|-id=644 bgcolor=#fefefe
| 157644 ||  || — || December 7, 2005 || Socorro || LINEAR || — || align=right | 1.1 km || 
|-id=645 bgcolor=#E9E9E9
| 157645 ||  || — || December 21, 2005 || Socorro || LINEAR || HNS || align=right | 2.5 km || 
|-id=646 bgcolor=#E9E9E9
| 157646 ||  || — || December 21, 2005 || Kitt Peak || Spacewatch || — || align=right | 2.2 km || 
|-id=647 bgcolor=#E9E9E9
| 157647 ||  || — || December 22, 2005 || Kitt Peak || Spacewatch || — || align=right | 3.5 km || 
|-id=648 bgcolor=#d6d6d6
| 157648 ||  || — || December 21, 2005 || Kitt Peak || Spacewatch || — || align=right | 2.4 km || 
|-id=649 bgcolor=#d6d6d6
| 157649 ||  || — || December 22, 2005 || Kitt Peak || Spacewatch || — || align=right | 3.2 km || 
|-id=650 bgcolor=#E9E9E9
| 157650 ||  || — || December 24, 2005 || Kitt Peak || Spacewatch || — || align=right | 1.5 km || 
|-id=651 bgcolor=#d6d6d6
| 157651 ||  || — || December 21, 2005 || Catalina || CSS || — || align=right | 5.1 km || 
|-id=652 bgcolor=#d6d6d6
| 157652 ||  || — || December 22, 2005 || Kitt Peak || Spacewatch || — || align=right | 4.9 km || 
|-id=653 bgcolor=#d6d6d6
| 157653 ||  || — || December 22, 2005 || Kitt Peak || Spacewatch || — || align=right | 5.0 km || 
|-id=654 bgcolor=#d6d6d6
| 157654 ||  || — || December 22, 2005 || Kitt Peak || Spacewatch || — || align=right | 4.9 km || 
|-id=655 bgcolor=#fefefe
| 157655 ||  || — || December 22, 2005 || Kitt Peak || Spacewatch || — || align=right data-sort-value="0.93" | 930 m || 
|-id=656 bgcolor=#E9E9E9
| 157656 ||  || — || December 24, 2005 || Kitt Peak || Spacewatch || — || align=right | 1.3 km || 
|-id=657 bgcolor=#E9E9E9
| 157657 ||  || — || December 25, 2005 || Kitt Peak || Spacewatch || HEN || align=right | 1.5 km || 
|-id=658 bgcolor=#d6d6d6
| 157658 ||  || — || December 21, 2005 || Catalina || CSS || 7:4 || align=right | 7.1 km || 
|-id=659 bgcolor=#d6d6d6
| 157659 ||  || — || December 22, 2005 || Kitt Peak || Spacewatch || THM || align=right | 4.7 km || 
|-id=660 bgcolor=#d6d6d6
| 157660 ||  || — || December 25, 2005 || Kitt Peak || Spacewatch || — || align=right | 3.5 km || 
|-id=661 bgcolor=#E9E9E9
| 157661 ||  || — || December 25, 2005 || Kitt Peak || Spacewatch || — || align=right | 2.6 km || 
|-id=662 bgcolor=#d6d6d6
| 157662 ||  || — || December 25, 2005 || Mount Lemmon || Mount Lemmon Survey || THM || align=right | 5.2 km || 
|-id=663 bgcolor=#d6d6d6
| 157663 ||  || — || December 22, 2005 || Kitt Peak || Spacewatch || KOR || align=right | 2.3 km || 
|-id=664 bgcolor=#fefefe
| 157664 ||  || — || December 24, 2005 || Kitt Peak || Spacewatch || MAS || align=right | 1.1 km || 
|-id=665 bgcolor=#d6d6d6
| 157665 ||  || — || December 24, 2005 || Kitt Peak || Spacewatch || — || align=right | 4.6 km || 
|-id=666 bgcolor=#fefefe
| 157666 ||  || — || December 22, 2005 || Catalina || CSS || PHO || align=right | 2.3 km || 
|-id=667 bgcolor=#E9E9E9
| 157667 ||  || — || December 24, 2005 || Kitt Peak || Spacewatch || — || align=right | 3.5 km || 
|-id=668 bgcolor=#d6d6d6
| 157668 ||  || — || December 24, 2005 || Kitt Peak || Spacewatch || — || align=right | 4.8 km || 
|-id=669 bgcolor=#E9E9E9
| 157669 ||  || — || December 24, 2005 || Kitt Peak || Spacewatch || MIS || align=right | 3.9 km || 
|-id=670 bgcolor=#d6d6d6
| 157670 ||  || — || December 27, 2005 || Mount Lemmon || Mount Lemmon Survey || HYG || align=right | 4.5 km || 
|-id=671 bgcolor=#d6d6d6
| 157671 ||  || — || December 27, 2005 || Mount Lemmon || Mount Lemmon Survey || — || align=right | 2.9 km || 
|-id=672 bgcolor=#d6d6d6
| 157672 ||  || — || December 26, 2005 || Kitt Peak || Spacewatch || KOR || align=right | 2.7 km || 
|-id=673 bgcolor=#fefefe
| 157673 ||  || — || December 26, 2005 || Kitt Peak || Spacewatch || — || align=right | 1.1 km || 
|-id=674 bgcolor=#E9E9E9
| 157674 ||  || — || December 28, 2005 || Mount Lemmon || Mount Lemmon Survey || — || align=right | 2.0 km || 
|-id=675 bgcolor=#E9E9E9
| 157675 ||  || — || December 26, 2005 || Kitt Peak || Spacewatch || — || align=right | 2.1 km || 
|-id=676 bgcolor=#d6d6d6
| 157676 ||  || — || December 28, 2005 || Mount Lemmon || Mount Lemmon Survey || — || align=right | 6.4 km || 
|-id=677 bgcolor=#d6d6d6
| 157677 ||  || — || December 25, 2005 || Mount Lemmon || Mount Lemmon Survey || — || align=right | 3.1 km || 
|-id=678 bgcolor=#E9E9E9
| 157678 ||  || — || December 26, 2005 || Kitt Peak || Spacewatch || — || align=right | 4.7 km || 
|-id=679 bgcolor=#d6d6d6
| 157679 ||  || — || December 26, 2005 || Mount Lemmon || Mount Lemmon Survey || — || align=right | 4.3 km || 
|-id=680 bgcolor=#E9E9E9
| 157680 ||  || — || December 26, 2005 || Kitt Peak || Spacewatch || AGN || align=right | 2.1 km || 
|-id=681 bgcolor=#E9E9E9
| 157681 ||  || — || December 22, 2005 || Socorro || LINEAR || — || align=right | 1.8 km || 
|-id=682 bgcolor=#E9E9E9
| 157682 ||  || — || December 22, 2005 || Catalina || CSS || — || align=right | 1.9 km || 
|-id=683 bgcolor=#d6d6d6
| 157683 ||  || — || December 25, 2005 || Mount Lemmon || Mount Lemmon Survey || THM || align=right | 3.3 km || 
|-id=684 bgcolor=#E9E9E9
| 157684 ||  || — || December 22, 2005 || Catalina || CSS || EUN || align=right | 2.1 km || 
|-id=685 bgcolor=#d6d6d6
| 157685 ||  || — || December 30, 2005 || Kitt Peak || Spacewatch || KOR || align=right | 2.6 km || 
|-id=686 bgcolor=#fefefe
| 157686 ||  || — || December 26, 2005 || Mount Lemmon || Mount Lemmon Survey || MAS || align=right | 1.2 km || 
|-id=687 bgcolor=#E9E9E9
| 157687 ||  || — || December 22, 2005 || Catalina || CSS || — || align=right | 5.8 km || 
|-id=688 bgcolor=#E9E9E9
| 157688 ||  || — || December 24, 2005 || Catalina || CSS || — || align=right | 4.3 km || 
|-id=689 bgcolor=#E9E9E9
| 157689 ||  || — || December 30, 2005 || Kitt Peak || Spacewatch || MRX || align=right | 1.8 km || 
|-id=690 bgcolor=#E9E9E9
| 157690 ||  || — || December 24, 2005 || Kitt Peak || Spacewatch || — || align=right | 2.9 km || 
|-id=691 bgcolor=#E9E9E9
| 157691 ||  || — || December 25, 2005 || Anderson Mesa || LONEOS || HNA || align=right | 3.2 km || 
|-id=692 bgcolor=#fefefe
| 157692 ||  || — || December 25, 2005 || Mount Lemmon || Mount Lemmon Survey || — || align=right | 1.7 km || 
|-id=693 bgcolor=#E9E9E9
| 157693 Amandamarty || 2006 AB ||  || January 2, 2006 || RAS || A. Lowe || — || align=right | 3.4 km || 
|-id=694 bgcolor=#d6d6d6
| 157694 ||  || — || January 5, 2006 || Rehoboth || Calvin–Rehoboth Obs. || URS || align=right | 4.9 km || 
|-id=695 bgcolor=#d6d6d6
| 157695 ||  || — || January 2, 2006 || Socorro || LINEAR || — || align=right | 5.2 km || 
|-id=696 bgcolor=#d6d6d6
| 157696 ||  || — || January 5, 2006 || Catalina || CSS || — || align=right | 5.9 km || 
|-id=697 bgcolor=#d6d6d6
| 157697 ||  || — || January 5, 2006 || Catalina || CSS || 7:4 || align=right | 6.6 km || 
|-id=698 bgcolor=#d6d6d6
| 157698 ||  || — || January 5, 2006 || Mount Lemmon || Mount Lemmon Survey || THM || align=right | 5.2 km || 
|-id=699 bgcolor=#E9E9E9
| 157699 ||  || — || January 5, 2006 || Kitt Peak || Spacewatch || — || align=right | 3.1 km || 
|-id=700 bgcolor=#d6d6d6
| 157700 ||  || — || January 5, 2006 || Anderson Mesa || LONEOS || EOS || align=right | 3.8 km || 
|}

157701–157800 

|-bgcolor=#d6d6d6
| 157701 ||  || — || January 5, 2006 || Catalina || CSS || 7:4 || align=right | 8.0 km || 
|-id=702 bgcolor=#E9E9E9
| 157702 ||  || — || January 5, 2006 || Catalina || CSS || — || align=right | 5.9 km || 
|-id=703 bgcolor=#d6d6d6
| 157703 ||  || — || January 5, 2006 || Catalina || CSS || — || align=right | 4.0 km || 
|-id=704 bgcolor=#d6d6d6
| 157704 ||  || — || January 2, 2006 || Catalina || CSS || — || align=right | 4.5 km || 
|-id=705 bgcolor=#d6d6d6
| 157705 ||  || — || January 4, 2006 || Mount Lemmon || Mount Lemmon Survey || — || align=right | 3.5 km || 
|-id=706 bgcolor=#d6d6d6
| 157706 ||  || — || January 5, 2006 || Kitt Peak || Spacewatch || — || align=right | 6.2 km || 
|-id=707 bgcolor=#d6d6d6
| 157707 ||  || — || January 5, 2006 || Kitt Peak || Spacewatch || THM || align=right | 3.8 km || 
|-id=708 bgcolor=#fefefe
| 157708 ||  || — || January 7, 2006 || Mount Lemmon || Mount Lemmon Survey || MAS || align=right | 1.2 km || 
|-id=709 bgcolor=#fefefe
| 157709 ||  || — || January 7, 2006 || Mount Lemmon || Mount Lemmon Survey || — || align=right | 1.4 km || 
|-id=710 bgcolor=#d6d6d6
| 157710 ||  || — || January 5, 2006 || Mount Lemmon || Mount Lemmon Survey || 3:2 || align=right | 4.5 km || 
|-id=711 bgcolor=#d6d6d6
| 157711 ||  || — || January 5, 2006 || Mount Lemmon || Mount Lemmon Survey || — || align=right | 3.4 km || 
|-id=712 bgcolor=#fefefe
| 157712 ||  || — || January 6, 2006 || Kitt Peak || Spacewatch || — || align=right | 1.7 km || 
|-id=713 bgcolor=#d6d6d6
| 157713 ||  || — || January 6, 2006 || Mount Lemmon || Mount Lemmon Survey || — || align=right | 4.4 km || 
|-id=714 bgcolor=#d6d6d6
| 157714 ||  || — || January 6, 2006 || Anderson Mesa || LONEOS || — || align=right | 5.4 km || 
|-id=715 bgcolor=#d6d6d6
| 157715 ||  || — || January 6, 2006 || Anderson Mesa || LONEOS || — || align=right | 4.5 km || 
|-id=716 bgcolor=#d6d6d6
| 157716 ||  || — || January 5, 2006 || Socorro || LINEAR || — || align=right | 6.0 km || 
|-id=717 bgcolor=#E9E9E9
| 157717 ||  || — || January 5, 2006 || Socorro || LINEAR || — || align=right | 3.3 km || 
|-id=718 bgcolor=#d6d6d6
| 157718 ||  || — || January 5, 2006 || Socorro || LINEAR || — || align=right | 5.9 km || 
|-id=719 bgcolor=#d6d6d6
| 157719 ||  || — || January 22, 2006 || Anderson Mesa || LONEOS || EOS || align=right | 3.5 km || 
|-id=720 bgcolor=#d6d6d6
| 157720 ||  || — || January 22, 2006 || Anderson Mesa || LONEOS || EOS || align=right | 4.1 km || 
|-id=721 bgcolor=#d6d6d6
| 157721 Kölcsey||  || — || January 24, 2006 || Piszkéstető || K. Sárneczky || KAR || align=right | 1.9 km || 
|-id=722 bgcolor=#d6d6d6
| 157722 ||  || — || January 20, 2006 || Kitt Peak || Spacewatch || — || align=right | 4.1 km || 
|-id=723 bgcolor=#d6d6d6
| 157723 ||  || — || January 20, 2006 || Kitt Peak || Spacewatch || — || align=right | 5.5 km || 
|-id=724 bgcolor=#d6d6d6
| 157724 ||  || — || January 25, 2006 || Kitt Peak || Spacewatch || THM || align=right | 3.1 km || 
|-id=725 bgcolor=#d6d6d6
| 157725 ||  || — || January 25, 2006 || Kitt Peak || Spacewatch || KOR || align=right | 1.5 km || 
|-id=726 bgcolor=#d6d6d6
| 157726 ||  || — || January 25, 2006 || Kitt Peak || Spacewatch || KOR || align=right | 2.7 km || 
|-id=727 bgcolor=#E9E9E9
| 157727 ||  || — || January 22, 2006 || Mount Lemmon || Mount Lemmon Survey || — || align=right | 1.7 km || 
|-id=728 bgcolor=#d6d6d6
| 157728 ||  || — || January 23, 2006 || Mount Lemmon || Mount Lemmon Survey || THM || align=right | 5.0 km || 
|-id=729 bgcolor=#d6d6d6
| 157729 ||  || — || January 25, 2006 || Catalina || CSS || — || align=right | 5.0 km || 
|-id=730 bgcolor=#C2FFFF
| 157730 ||  || — || January 25, 2006 || Kitt Peak || Spacewatch || L5 || align=right | 8.4 km || 
|-id=731 bgcolor=#d6d6d6
| 157731 ||  || — || January 25, 2006 || Kitt Peak || Spacewatch || KOR || align=right | 1.9 km || 
|-id=732 bgcolor=#d6d6d6
| 157732 ||  || — || January 28, 2006 || Mount Lemmon || Mount Lemmon Survey || — || align=right | 5.9 km || 
|-id=733 bgcolor=#d6d6d6
| 157733 ||  || — || January 19, 2006 || Catalina || CSS || EOS || align=right | 3.0 km || 
|-id=734 bgcolor=#E9E9E9
| 157734 ||  || — || January 24, 2006 || Anderson Mesa || LONEOS || — || align=right | 4.5 km || 
|-id=735 bgcolor=#d6d6d6
| 157735 ||  || — || January 25, 2006 || Kitt Peak || Spacewatch || — || align=right | 5.6 km || 
|-id=736 bgcolor=#d6d6d6
| 157736 ||  || — || January 25, 2006 || Kitt Peak || Spacewatch || — || align=right | 5.1 km || 
|-id=737 bgcolor=#d6d6d6
| 157737 ||  || — || January 26, 2006 || Anderson Mesa || LONEOS || — || align=right | 6.0 km || 
|-id=738 bgcolor=#d6d6d6
| 157738 ||  || — || January 27, 2006 || Socorro || LINEAR || THM || align=right | 3.3 km || 
|-id=739 bgcolor=#d6d6d6
| 157739 ||  || — || January 28, 2006 || Kitt Peak || Spacewatch || — || align=right | 5.0 km || 
|-id=740 bgcolor=#C2FFFF
| 157740 ||  || — || January 30, 2006 || Kitt Peak || Spacewatch || L5 || align=right | 11 km || 
|-id=741 bgcolor=#C2FFFF
| 157741 ||  || — || January 31, 2006 || Kitt Peak || Spacewatch || L5 || align=right | 15 km || 
|-id=742 bgcolor=#d6d6d6
| 157742 ||  || — || January 24, 2006 || Socorro || LINEAR || HYG || align=right | 5.4 km || 
|-id=743 bgcolor=#E9E9E9
| 157743 ||  || — || January 30, 2006 || Kitt Peak || Spacewatch || — || align=right | 3.0 km || 
|-id=744 bgcolor=#d6d6d6
| 157744 ||  || — || January 31, 2006 || Kitt Peak || Spacewatch || HYG || align=right | 4.7 km || 
|-id=745 bgcolor=#d6d6d6
| 157745 ||  || — || January 31, 2006 || Kitt Peak || Spacewatch || — || align=right | 3.3 km || 
|-id=746 bgcolor=#d6d6d6
| 157746 ||  || — || January 26, 2006 || Catalina || CSS || — || align=right | 4.5 km || 
|-id=747 bgcolor=#d6d6d6
| 157747 Mandryka ||  ||  || February 2, 2006 || Tenagra II || J.-C. Merlin || TIR || align=right | 4.8 km || 
|-id=748 bgcolor=#d6d6d6
| 157748 ||  || — || February 1, 2006 || Mount Lemmon || Mount Lemmon Survey || — || align=right | 4.0 km || 
|-id=749 bgcolor=#d6d6d6
| 157749 ||  || — || February 2, 2006 || Kitt Peak || Spacewatch || — || align=right | 5.3 km || 
|-id=750 bgcolor=#d6d6d6
| 157750 ||  || — || February 3, 2006 || Kitt Peak || Spacewatch || — || align=right | 3.6 km || 
|-id=751 bgcolor=#d6d6d6
| 157751 ||  || — || February 4, 2006 || Kitt Peak || Spacewatch || THM || align=right | 3.6 km || 
|-id=752 bgcolor=#E9E9E9
| 157752 ||  || — || February 4, 2006 || Catalina || CSS || — || align=right | 1.6 km || 
|-id=753 bgcolor=#E9E9E9
| 157753 ||  || — || February 20, 2006 || Kitt Peak || Spacewatch || — || align=right | 2.1 km || 
|-id=754 bgcolor=#d6d6d6
| 157754 ||  || — || February 24, 2006 || Kitt Peak || Spacewatch || — || align=right | 3.5 km || 
|-id=755 bgcolor=#d6d6d6
| 157755 ||  || — || February 25, 2006 || Mount Lemmon || Mount Lemmon Survey || THM || align=right | 3.3 km || 
|-id=756 bgcolor=#d6d6d6
| 157756 ||  || — || March 3, 2006 || Kitt Peak || Spacewatch || — || align=right | 3.4 km || 
|-id=757 bgcolor=#d6d6d6
| 157757 ||  || — || March 4, 2006 || Kitt Peak || Spacewatch || — || align=right | 4.3 km || 
|-id=758 bgcolor=#fefefe
| 157758 ||  || — || January 15, 2007 || Anderson Mesa || LONEOS || — || align=right | 1.4 km || 
|-id=759 bgcolor=#d6d6d6
| 157759 ||  || — || February 17, 2007 || Kitt Peak || Spacewatch || KOR || align=right | 1.5 km || 
|-id=760 bgcolor=#d6d6d6
| 157760 ||  || — || February 17, 2007 || Kitt Peak || Spacewatch || THM || align=right | 3.1 km || 
|-id=761 bgcolor=#E9E9E9
| 157761 ||  || — || February 17, 2007 || Kitt Peak || Spacewatch || — || align=right | 2.4 km || 
|-id=762 bgcolor=#fefefe
| 157762 ||  || — || February 17, 2007 || Kitt Peak || Spacewatch || — || align=right data-sort-value="0.79" | 790 m || 
|-id=763 bgcolor=#E9E9E9
| 157763 ||  || — || February 17, 2007 || Kitt Peak || Spacewatch || HOF || align=right | 3.4 km || 
|-id=764 bgcolor=#d6d6d6
| 157764 ||  || — || February 21, 2007 || Mount Lemmon || Mount Lemmon Survey || THM || align=right | 2.5 km || 
|-id=765 bgcolor=#E9E9E9
| 157765 ||  || — || February 21, 2007 || Kitt Peak || Spacewatch || — || align=right | 2.9 km || 
|-id=766 bgcolor=#E9E9E9
| 157766 ||  || — || February 23, 2007 || Catalina || CSS || — || align=right | 3.6 km || 
|-id=767 bgcolor=#fefefe
| 157767 ||  || — || February 25, 2007 || Mount Lemmon || Mount Lemmon Survey || V || align=right data-sort-value="0.97" | 970 m || 
|-id=768 bgcolor=#E9E9E9
| 157768 ||  || — || February 23, 2007 || Mount Lemmon || Mount Lemmon Survey || — || align=right | 1.1 km || 
|-id=769 bgcolor=#d6d6d6
| 157769 ||  || — || March 9, 2007 || Kitt Peak || Spacewatch || — || align=right | 6.8 km || 
|-id=770 bgcolor=#fefefe
| 157770 ||  || — || March 9, 2007 || Kitt Peak || Spacewatch || NYS || align=right data-sort-value="0.82" | 820 m || 
|-id=771 bgcolor=#d6d6d6
| 157771 ||  || — || March 9, 2007 || Mount Lemmon || Mount Lemmon Survey || KOR || align=right | 1.3 km || 
|-id=772 bgcolor=#fefefe
| 157772 ||  || — || March 9, 2007 || Mount Lemmon || Mount Lemmon Survey || — || align=right data-sort-value="0.85" | 850 m || 
|-id=773 bgcolor=#E9E9E9
| 157773 ||  || — || March 10, 2007 || Mount Lemmon || Mount Lemmon Survey || — || align=right | 1.2 km || 
|-id=774 bgcolor=#E9E9E9
| 157774 || 2007 FF || — || March 16, 2007 || Mount Lemmon || Mount Lemmon Survey || AGN || align=right | 1.9 km || 
|-id=775 bgcolor=#d6d6d6
| 157775 ||  || — || March 16, 2007 || Catalina || CSS || — || align=right | 5.3 km || 
|-id=776 bgcolor=#fefefe
| 157776 || 2770 P-L || — || September 24, 1960 || Palomar || PLS || — || align=right | 1.3 km || 
|-id=777 bgcolor=#d6d6d6
| 157777 || 6239 P-L || — || September 24, 1960 || Palomar || PLS || — || align=right | 4.3 km || 
|-id=778 bgcolor=#fefefe
| 157778 || 6812 P-L || — || September 24, 1960 || Palomar || PLS || V || align=right | 1.2 km || 
|-id=779 bgcolor=#E9E9E9
| 157779 || 7582 P-L || — || October 17, 1960 || Palomar || PLS || EUN || align=right | 2.2 km || 
|-id=780 bgcolor=#FA8072
| 157780 || 7620 P-L || — || October 17, 1960 || Palomar || PLS || — || align=right | 1.5 km || 
|-id=781 bgcolor=#d6d6d6
| 157781 || 3077 T-2 || — || September 30, 1973 || Palomar || PLS || — || align=right | 5.2 km || 
|-id=782 bgcolor=#E9E9E9
| 157782 || 3296 T-2 || — || September 30, 1973 || Palomar || PLS || EUN || align=right | 2.0 km || 
|-id=783 bgcolor=#d6d6d6
| 157783 || 2124 T-3 || — || October 16, 1977 || Palomar || PLS || — || align=right | 4.0 km || 
|-id=784 bgcolor=#E9E9E9
| 157784 || 3458 T-3 || — || October 16, 1977 || Palomar || PLS || PAD || align=right | 2.7 km || 
|-id=785 bgcolor=#E9E9E9
| 157785 || 4233 T-3 || — || October 16, 1977 || Palomar || PLS || — || align=right | 5.5 km || 
|-id=786 bgcolor=#fefefe
| 157786 || 4345 T-3 || — || October 16, 1977 || Palomar || PLS || — || align=right | 1.2 km || 
|-id=787 bgcolor=#E9E9E9
| 157787 || 4443 T-3 || — || October 16, 1977 || Palomar || PLS || — || align=right | 2.8 km || 
|-id=788 bgcolor=#d6d6d6
| 157788 || 5020 T-3 || — || October 16, 1977 || Palomar || PLS || — || align=right | 4.2 km || 
|-id=789 bgcolor=#E9E9E9
| 157789 ||  || — || September 8, 1991 || Kitt Peak || Spacewatch || — || align=right | 1.4 km || 
|-id=790 bgcolor=#fefefe
| 157790 ||  || — || November 4, 1991 || Kitt Peak || Spacewatch || — || align=right data-sort-value="0.83" | 830 m || 
|-id=791 bgcolor=#d6d6d6
| 157791 ||  || — || September 24, 1992 || Kitt Peak || Spacewatch || — || align=right | 3.9 km || 
|-id=792 bgcolor=#E9E9E9
| 157792 ||  || — || March 19, 1993 || La Silla || UESAC || — || align=right | 3.2 km || 
|-id=793 bgcolor=#E9E9E9
| 157793 ||  || — || March 9, 1994 || Caussols || E. W. Elst || — || align=right | 3.4 km || 
|-id=794 bgcolor=#E9E9E9
| 157794 ||  || — || August 10, 1994 || La Silla || E. W. Elst || DOR || align=right | 4.4 km || 
|-id=795 bgcolor=#d6d6d6
| 157795 ||  || — || February 1, 1995 || Kitt Peak || Spacewatch || — || align=right | 4.1 km || 
|-id=796 bgcolor=#d6d6d6
| 157796 ||  || — || March 23, 1995 || Kitt Peak || Spacewatch || THM || align=right | 3.4 km || 
|-id=797 bgcolor=#E9E9E9
| 157797 ||  || — || July 30, 1995 || Kitt Peak || Spacewatch || — || align=right | 1.4 km || 
|-id=798 bgcolor=#E9E9E9
| 157798 ||  || — || July 22, 1995 || Kitt Peak || Spacewatch || — || align=right | 4.0 km || 
|-id=799 bgcolor=#E9E9E9
| 157799 ||  || — || September 18, 1995 || Kitt Peak || Spacewatch || — || align=right | 3.9 km || 
|-id=800 bgcolor=#E9E9E9
| 157800 ||  || — || September 18, 1995 || Kitt Peak || Spacewatch || — || align=right | 2.2 km || 
|}

157801–157900 

|-bgcolor=#E9E9E9
| 157801 ||  || — || September 20, 1995 || Kitt Peak || Spacewatch || — || align=right | 2.2 km || 
|-id=802 bgcolor=#E9E9E9
| 157802 ||  || — || September 25, 1995 || Kitt Peak || Spacewatch || — || align=right | 2.2 km || 
|-id=803 bgcolor=#E9E9E9
| 157803 ||  || — || September 17, 1995 || Kitt Peak || Spacewatch || — || align=right | 2.0 km || 
|-id=804 bgcolor=#E9E9E9
| 157804 ||  || — || September 25, 1995 || Kitt Peak || Spacewatch || — || align=right | 2.3 km || 
|-id=805 bgcolor=#E9E9E9
| 157805 ||  || — || October 15, 1995 || Kitt Peak || Spacewatch || — || align=right | 2.6 km || 
|-id=806 bgcolor=#E9E9E9
| 157806 ||  || — || October 17, 1995 || Kitt Peak || Spacewatch || — || align=right | 2.4 km || 
|-id=807 bgcolor=#E9E9E9
| 157807 ||  || — || October 17, 1995 || Kitt Peak || Spacewatch || — || align=right | 3.8 km || 
|-id=808 bgcolor=#E9E9E9
| 157808 ||  || — || October 25, 1995 || Kitt Peak || Spacewatch || WIT || align=right | 1.8 km || 
|-id=809 bgcolor=#E9E9E9
| 157809 ||  || — || October 17, 1995 || Kitt Peak || Spacewatch || — || align=right | 3.1 km || 
|-id=810 bgcolor=#E9E9E9
| 157810 ||  || — || October 23, 1995 || Kitt Peak || Spacewatch || — || align=right | 2.2 km || 
|-id=811 bgcolor=#E9E9E9
| 157811 ||  || — || October 25, 1995 || Kitt Peak || Spacewatch || CLO || align=right | 3.8 km || 
|-id=812 bgcolor=#fefefe
| 157812 ||  || — || October 24, 1995 || Kitt Peak || Spacewatch || — || align=right | 1.1 km || 
|-id=813 bgcolor=#fefefe
| 157813 ||  || — || November 16, 1995 || Church Stretton || S. P. Laurie || FLO || align=right | 1.2 km || 
|-id=814 bgcolor=#E9E9E9
| 157814 ||  || — || November 19, 1995 || Kitt Peak || Spacewatch || — || align=right | 4.4 km || 
|-id=815 bgcolor=#fefefe
| 157815 ||  || — || March 18, 1996 || Kitt Peak || Spacewatch || MAS || align=right data-sort-value="0.79" | 790 m || 
|-id=816 bgcolor=#d6d6d6
| 157816 ||  || — || April 12, 1996 || Kitt Peak || Spacewatch || — || align=right | 4.3 km || 
|-id=817 bgcolor=#fefefe
| 157817 ||  || — || April 13, 1996 || Kitt Peak || Spacewatch || — || align=right | 1.3 km || 
|-id=818 bgcolor=#fefefe
| 157818 ||  || — || April 13, 1996 || Kitt Peak || Spacewatch || ERI || align=right | 3.4 km || 
|-id=819 bgcolor=#d6d6d6
| 157819 ||  || — || May 11, 1996 || Kitt Peak || Spacewatch || — || align=right | 3.2 km || 
|-id=820 bgcolor=#E9E9E9
| 157820 ||  || — || October 5, 1996 || Kitt Peak || Spacewatch || — || align=right | 2.1 km || 
|-id=821 bgcolor=#E9E9E9
| 157821 ||  || — || October 6, 1996 || Kitt Peak || Spacewatch || — || align=right | 1.3 km || 
|-id=822 bgcolor=#E9E9E9
| 157822 ||  || — || October 7, 1996 || Kitt Peak || Spacewatch || — || align=right | 1.1 km || 
|-id=823 bgcolor=#E9E9E9
| 157823 ||  || — || December 7, 1996 || Kitt Peak || Spacewatch || — || align=right | 3.3 km || 
|-id=824 bgcolor=#E9E9E9
| 157824 ||  || — || February 2, 1997 || Kitt Peak || Spacewatch || HEN || align=right | 1.8 km || 
|-id=825 bgcolor=#d6d6d6
| 157825 ||  || — || September 12, 1997 || Ondřejov || M. Wolf, L. Kotková || — || align=right | 6.7 km || 
|-id=826 bgcolor=#fefefe
| 157826 ||  || — || September 29, 1997 || Kitt Peak || Spacewatch || V || align=right | 1.5 km || 
|-id=827 bgcolor=#fefefe
| 157827 ||  || — || October 7, 1997 || Xinglong || SCAP || — || align=right | 1.4 km || 
|-id=828 bgcolor=#fefefe
| 157828 ||  || — || November 23, 1997 || Kitt Peak || Spacewatch || — || align=right | 1.3 km || 
|-id=829 bgcolor=#fefefe
| 157829 ||  || — || November 29, 1997 || Socorro || LINEAR || — || align=right | 3.6 km || 
|-id=830 bgcolor=#E9E9E9
| 157830 || 1997 YE || — || December 18, 1997 || Oizumi || T. Kobayashi || — || align=right | 1.7 km || 
|-id=831 bgcolor=#E9E9E9
| 157831 ||  || — || January 25, 1998 || Oizumi || T. Kobayashi || — || align=right | 1.6 km || 
|-id=832 bgcolor=#d6d6d6
| 157832 ||  || — || January 24, 1998 || Kitt Peak || Spacewatch || HIL3:2 || align=right | 8.5 km || 
|-id=833 bgcolor=#E9E9E9
| 157833 ||  || — || March 20, 1998 || Kitt Peak || Spacewatch || — || align=right | 2.2 km || 
|-id=834 bgcolor=#E9E9E9
| 157834 ||  || — || March 20, 1998 || Socorro || LINEAR || — || align=right | 2.1 km || 
|-id=835 bgcolor=#E9E9E9
| 157835 ||  || — || March 20, 1998 || Socorro || LINEAR || — || align=right | 3.7 km || 
|-id=836 bgcolor=#E9E9E9
| 157836 ||  || — || March 31, 1998 || Socorro || LINEAR || — || align=right | 5.8 km || 
|-id=837 bgcolor=#E9E9E9
| 157837 ||  || — || March 24, 1998 || Socorro || LINEAR || — || align=right | 2.8 km || 
|-id=838 bgcolor=#E9E9E9
| 157838 ||  || — || March 28, 1998 || Socorro || LINEAR || — || align=right | 2.7 km || 
|-id=839 bgcolor=#E9E9E9
| 157839 ||  || — || April 2, 1998 || Socorro || LINEAR || — || align=right | 3.6 km || 
|-id=840 bgcolor=#E9E9E9
| 157840 ||  || — || April 18, 1998 || Kitt Peak || Spacewatch || — || align=right | 3.3 km || 
|-id=841 bgcolor=#E9E9E9
| 157841 ||  || — || April 21, 1998 || Socorro || LINEAR || — || align=right | 2.7 km || 
|-id=842 bgcolor=#E9E9E9
| 157842 ||  || — || June 16, 1998 || Kitt Peak || Spacewatch || NEM || align=right | 3.3 km || 
|-id=843 bgcolor=#d6d6d6
| 157843 ||  || — || August 23, 1998 || Xinglong || SCAP || — || align=right | 2.7 km || 
|-id=844 bgcolor=#E9E9E9
| 157844 ||  || — || August 24, 1998 || Socorro || LINEAR || — || align=right | 6.3 km || 
|-id=845 bgcolor=#fefefe
| 157845 ||  || — || September 14, 1998 || Socorro || LINEAR || — || align=right | 3.0 km || 
|-id=846 bgcolor=#fefefe
| 157846 ||  || — || September 14, 1998 || Socorro || LINEAR || — || align=right | 1.0 km || 
|-id=847 bgcolor=#fefefe
| 157847 ||  || — || September 14, 1998 || Socorro || LINEAR || FLO || align=right data-sort-value="0.90" | 900 m || 
|-id=848 bgcolor=#d6d6d6
| 157848 ||  || — || September 14, 1998 || Socorro || LINEAR || — || align=right | 5.4 km || 
|-id=849 bgcolor=#d6d6d6
| 157849 ||  || — || September 26, 1998 || Socorro || LINEAR || TEL || align=right | 3.8 km || 
|-id=850 bgcolor=#d6d6d6
| 157850 ||  || — || September 26, 1998 || Socorro || LINEAR || — || align=right | 3.5 km || 
|-id=851 bgcolor=#d6d6d6
| 157851 ||  || — || September 26, 1998 || Socorro || LINEAR || — || align=right | 4.5 km || 
|-id=852 bgcolor=#d6d6d6
| 157852 ||  || — || October 13, 1998 || Kleť || Kleť Obs. || — || align=right | 7.3 km || 
|-id=853 bgcolor=#d6d6d6
| 157853 ||  || — || October 13, 1998 || Kitt Peak || Spacewatch || — || align=right | 3.3 km || 
|-id=854 bgcolor=#d6d6d6
| 157854 ||  || — || October 14, 1998 || Caussols || ODAS || EOS || align=right | 3.1 km || 
|-id=855 bgcolor=#d6d6d6
| 157855 ||  || — || October 13, 1998 || Kitt Peak || Spacewatch || — || align=right | 4.2 km || 
|-id=856 bgcolor=#fefefe
| 157856 ||  || — || October 14, 1998 || Kitt Peak || Spacewatch || FLO || align=right data-sort-value="0.85" | 850 m || 
|-id=857 bgcolor=#fefefe
| 157857 ||  || — || October 17, 1998 || Kitt Peak || Spacewatch || — || align=right | 1.1 km || 
|-id=858 bgcolor=#d6d6d6
| 157858 ||  || — || October 28, 1998 || Socorro || LINEAR || — || align=right | 4.6 km || 
|-id=859 bgcolor=#d6d6d6
| 157859 ||  || — || October 27, 1998 || Caussols || ODAS || — || align=right | 7.7 km || 
|-id=860 bgcolor=#d6d6d6
| 157860 ||  || — || November 10, 1998 || Socorro || LINEAR || — || align=right | 4.4 km || 
|-id=861 bgcolor=#d6d6d6
| 157861 ||  || — || November 15, 1998 || Kitt Peak || Spacewatch || 3:2 || align=right | 6.7 km || 
|-id=862 bgcolor=#d6d6d6
| 157862 ||  || — || November 21, 1998 || Socorro || LINEAR || — || align=right | 6.9 km || 
|-id=863 bgcolor=#fefefe
| 157863 ||  || — || November 16, 1998 || Kitt Peak || Spacewatch || FLO || align=right | 1.0 km || 
|-id=864 bgcolor=#fefefe
| 157864 ||  || — || November 21, 1998 || Kitt Peak || Spacewatch || V || align=right data-sort-value="0.95" | 950 m || 
|-id=865 bgcolor=#d6d6d6
| 157865 ||  || — || November 22, 1998 || Kitt Peak || Spacewatch || — || align=right | 3.6 km || 
|-id=866 bgcolor=#d6d6d6
| 157866 ||  || — || December 17, 1998 || Caussols || ODAS || HYG || align=right | 4.9 km || 
|-id=867 bgcolor=#fefefe
| 157867 ||  || — || February 10, 1999 || Socorro || LINEAR || V || align=right | 1.3 km || 
|-id=868 bgcolor=#fefefe
| 157868 ||  || — || February 10, 1999 || Socorro || LINEAR || — || align=right | 1.6 km || 
|-id=869 bgcolor=#fefefe
| 157869 ||  || — || March 14, 1999 || Kitt Peak || Spacewatch || MAS || align=right data-sort-value="0.99" | 990 m || 
|-id=870 bgcolor=#fefefe
| 157870 ||  || — || March 14, 1999 || Kitt Peak || Spacewatch || — || align=right | 1.4 km || 
|-id=871 bgcolor=#E9E9E9
| 157871 ||  || — || March 12, 1999 || Socorro || LINEAR || BAR || align=right | 4.2 km || 
|-id=872 bgcolor=#E9E9E9
| 157872 ||  || — || April 14, 1999 || Ondřejov || L. Kotková || — || align=right | 1.9 km || 
|-id=873 bgcolor=#fefefe
| 157873 ||  || — || May 14, 1999 || Goodricke-Pigott || R. A. Tucker || H || align=right | 1.00 km || 
|-id=874 bgcolor=#E9E9E9
| 157874 ||  || — || May 15, 1999 || Catalina || CSS || — || align=right | 1.7 km || 
|-id=875 bgcolor=#E9E9E9
| 157875 ||  || — || May 10, 1999 || Socorro || LINEAR || — || align=right | 2.0 km || 
|-id=876 bgcolor=#E9E9E9
| 157876 ||  || — || May 12, 1999 || Socorro || LINEAR || INO || align=right | 2.3 km || 
|-id=877 bgcolor=#E9E9E9
| 157877 ||  || — || May 13, 1999 || Socorro || LINEAR || — || align=right | 1.6 km || 
|-id=878 bgcolor=#E9E9E9
| 157878 ||  || — || May 16, 1999 || Kitt Peak || Spacewatch || — || align=right | 1.0 km || 
|-id=879 bgcolor=#E9E9E9
| 157879 ||  || — || July 12, 1999 || Socorro || LINEAR || MAR || align=right | 2.4 km || 
|-id=880 bgcolor=#E9E9E9
| 157880 ||  || — || July 13, 1999 || Socorro || LINEAR || — || align=right | 5.3 km || 
|-id=881 bgcolor=#E9E9E9
| 157881 || 1999 RZ || — || September 4, 1999 || Catalina || CSS || — || align=right | 4.0 km || 
|-id=882 bgcolor=#E9E9E9
| 157882 ||  || — || September 5, 1999 || Višnjan Observatory || K. Korlević || — || align=right | 3.2 km || 
|-id=883 bgcolor=#d6d6d6
| 157883 ||  || — || September 13, 1999 || Višnjan Observatory || K. Korlević || — || align=right | 6.0 km || 
|-id=884 bgcolor=#E9E9E9
| 157884 ||  || — || September 14, 1999 || Črni Vrh || Črni Vrh || — || align=right | 3.7 km || 
|-id=885 bgcolor=#E9E9E9
| 157885 ||  || — || September 7, 1999 || Socorro || LINEAR || — || align=right | 5.6 km || 
|-id=886 bgcolor=#E9E9E9
| 157886 ||  || — || September 7, 1999 || Socorro || LINEAR || — || align=right | 4.2 km || 
|-id=887 bgcolor=#E9E9E9
| 157887 ||  || — || September 9, 1999 || Socorro || LINEAR || — || align=right | 5.7 km || 
|-id=888 bgcolor=#d6d6d6
| 157888 ||  || — || September 9, 1999 || Socorro || LINEAR || — || align=right | 4.1 km || 
|-id=889 bgcolor=#E9E9E9
| 157889 ||  || — || September 8, 1999 || Socorro || LINEAR || — || align=right | 6.0 km || 
|-id=890 bgcolor=#E9E9E9
| 157890 ||  || — || September 8, 1999 || Socorro || LINEAR || — || align=right | 4.2 km || 
|-id=891 bgcolor=#E9E9E9
| 157891 ||  || — || September 8, 1999 || Catalina || CSS || — || align=right | 3.1 km || 
|-id=892 bgcolor=#E9E9E9
| 157892 ||  || — || September 7, 1999 || Kitt Peak || Spacewatch || — || align=right | 2.7 km || 
|-id=893 bgcolor=#E9E9E9
| 157893 ||  || — || September 30, 1999 || Catalina || CSS || — || align=right | 3.1 km || 
|-id=894 bgcolor=#d6d6d6
| 157894 ||  || — || October 14, 1999 || Heppenheim || Starkenburg Obs. || — || align=right | 2.1 km || 
|-id=895 bgcolor=#E9E9E9
| 157895 ||  || — || October 3, 1999 || Kitt Peak || Spacewatch || NEM || align=right | 4.5 km || 
|-id=896 bgcolor=#d6d6d6
| 157896 ||  || — || October 3, 1999 || Kitt Peak || Spacewatch || KOR || align=right | 1.8 km || 
|-id=897 bgcolor=#d6d6d6
| 157897 ||  || — || October 10, 1999 || Kitt Peak || Spacewatch || THM || align=right | 2.5 km || 
|-id=898 bgcolor=#d6d6d6
| 157898 ||  || — || October 2, 1999 || Socorro || LINEAR || — || align=right | 5.9 km || 
|-id=899 bgcolor=#E9E9E9
| 157899 ||  || — || October 4, 1999 || Socorro || LINEAR || — || align=right | 4.8 km || 
|-id=900 bgcolor=#E9E9E9
| 157900 ||  || — || October 4, 1999 || Socorro || LINEAR || DORslow || align=right | 4.8 km || 
|}

157901–158000 

|-bgcolor=#E9E9E9
| 157901 ||  || — || October 4, 1999 || Socorro || LINEAR || — || align=right | 4.5 km || 
|-id=902 bgcolor=#E9E9E9
| 157902 ||  || — || October 4, 1999 || Socorro || LINEAR || MIT || align=right | 5.6 km || 
|-id=903 bgcolor=#E9E9E9
| 157903 ||  || — || October 6, 1999 || Socorro || LINEAR || — || align=right | 3.4 km || 
|-id=904 bgcolor=#d6d6d6
| 157904 ||  || — || October 6, 1999 || Socorro || LINEAR || — || align=right | 3.4 km || 
|-id=905 bgcolor=#d6d6d6
| 157905 ||  || — || October 6, 1999 || Socorro || LINEAR || — || align=right | 4.1 km || 
|-id=906 bgcolor=#E9E9E9
| 157906 ||  || — || October 7, 1999 || Socorro || LINEAR || — || align=right | 3.4 km || 
|-id=907 bgcolor=#d6d6d6
| 157907 ||  || — || October 7, 1999 || Socorro || LINEAR || — || align=right | 3.2 km || 
|-id=908 bgcolor=#E9E9E9
| 157908 ||  || — || October 8, 1999 || Socorro || LINEAR || PAD || align=right | 3.4 km || 
|-id=909 bgcolor=#d6d6d6
| 157909 ||  || — || October 11, 1999 || Socorro || LINEAR || KOR || align=right | 2.4 km || 
|-id=910 bgcolor=#d6d6d6
| 157910 ||  || — || October 13, 1999 || Socorro || LINEAR || — || align=right | 3.9 km || 
|-id=911 bgcolor=#E9E9E9
| 157911 ||  || — || October 3, 1999 || Catalina || CSS || — || align=right | 4.8 km || 
|-id=912 bgcolor=#E9E9E9
| 157912 ||  || — || October 9, 1999 || Kitt Peak || Spacewatch || — || align=right | 2.6 km || 
|-id=913 bgcolor=#E9E9E9
| 157913 ||  || — || October 3, 1999 || Socorro || LINEAR || — || align=right | 4.9 km || 
|-id=914 bgcolor=#E9E9E9
| 157914 ||  || — || October 10, 1999 || Socorro || LINEAR || PAL || align=right | 5.8 km || 
|-id=915 bgcolor=#E9E9E9
| 157915 ||  || — || October 6, 1999 || Socorro || LINEAR || — || align=right | 3.1 km || 
|-id=916 bgcolor=#d6d6d6
| 157916 ||  || — || October 6, 1999 || Kitt Peak || Spacewatch || KOR || align=right | 2.4 km || 
|-id=917 bgcolor=#d6d6d6
| 157917 ||  || — || October 29, 1999 || Catalina || CSS || — || align=right | 4.0 km || 
|-id=918 bgcolor=#d6d6d6
| 157918 ||  || — || October 31, 1999 || Kitt Peak || Spacewatch || — || align=right | 3.2 km || 
|-id=919 bgcolor=#E9E9E9
| 157919 ||  || — || October 29, 1999 || Anderson Mesa || LONEOS || — || align=right | 5.1 km || 
|-id=920 bgcolor=#d6d6d6
| 157920 ||  || — || November 3, 1999 || Socorro || LINEAR || — || align=right | 3.9 km || 
|-id=921 bgcolor=#E9E9E9
| 157921 ||  || — || November 3, 1999 || Socorro || LINEAR || DOR || align=right | 4.8 km || 
|-id=922 bgcolor=#d6d6d6
| 157922 ||  || — || November 4, 1999 || Socorro || LINEAR || — || align=right | 4.2 km || 
|-id=923 bgcolor=#fefefe
| 157923 ||  || — || November 4, 1999 || Socorro || LINEAR || FLO || align=right data-sort-value="0.88" | 880 m || 
|-id=924 bgcolor=#d6d6d6
| 157924 ||  || — || November 6, 1999 || Kitt Peak || Spacewatch || — || align=right | 3.7 km || 
|-id=925 bgcolor=#E9E9E9
| 157925 ||  || — || November 4, 1999 || Socorro || LINEAR || — || align=right | 3.9 km || 
|-id=926 bgcolor=#d6d6d6
| 157926 ||  || — || November 9, 1999 || Socorro || LINEAR || KOR || align=right | 2.1 km || 
|-id=927 bgcolor=#E9E9E9
| 157927 ||  || — || November 9, 1999 || Socorro || LINEAR || GEF || align=right | 2.0 km || 
|-id=928 bgcolor=#d6d6d6
| 157928 ||  || — || November 5, 1999 || Kitt Peak || Spacewatch || — || align=right | 4.7 km || 
|-id=929 bgcolor=#d6d6d6
| 157929 ||  || — || November 9, 1999 || Kitt Peak || Spacewatch || — || align=right | 5.5 km || 
|-id=930 bgcolor=#d6d6d6
| 157930 ||  || — || November 10, 1999 || Kitt Peak || Spacewatch || KOR || align=right | 1.9 km || 
|-id=931 bgcolor=#d6d6d6
| 157931 ||  || — || November 14, 1999 || Socorro || LINEAR || — || align=right | 3.7 km || 
|-id=932 bgcolor=#d6d6d6
| 157932 ||  || — || November 12, 1999 || Kitt Peak || Spacewatch || KOR || align=right | 1.9 km || 
|-id=933 bgcolor=#d6d6d6
| 157933 ||  || — || November 15, 1999 || Socorro || LINEAR || HYG || align=right | 4.2 km || 
|-id=934 bgcolor=#E9E9E9
| 157934 ||  || — || November 3, 1999 || Catalina || CSS || — || align=right | 4.5 km || 
|-id=935 bgcolor=#d6d6d6
| 157935 ||  || — || November 12, 1999 || Socorro || LINEAR || EOS || align=right | 2.3 km || 
|-id=936 bgcolor=#d6d6d6
| 157936 ||  || — || November 29, 1999 || Kitt Peak || Spacewatch || — || align=right | 2.8 km || 
|-id=937 bgcolor=#d6d6d6
| 157937 ||  || — || November 29, 1999 || Kitt Peak || Spacewatch || — || align=right | 2.9 km || 
|-id=938 bgcolor=#d6d6d6
| 157938 ||  || — || December 7, 1999 || Socorro || LINEAR || — || align=right | 3.9 km || 
|-id=939 bgcolor=#d6d6d6
| 157939 ||  || — || December 7, 1999 || Socorro || LINEAR || EOS || align=right | 4.6 km || 
|-id=940 bgcolor=#d6d6d6
| 157940 ||  || — || December 7, 1999 || Socorro || LINEAR || — || align=right | 4.7 km || 
|-id=941 bgcolor=#d6d6d6
| 157941 ||  || — || December 5, 1999 || Kitt Peak || Spacewatch || KOR || align=right | 1.9 km || 
|-id=942 bgcolor=#d6d6d6
| 157942 ||  || — || December 27, 1999 || Kitt Peak || Spacewatch || KOR || align=right | 1.8 km || 
|-id=943 bgcolor=#d6d6d6
| 157943 ||  || — || January 3, 2000 || Socorro || LINEAR || — || align=right | 2.3 km || 
|-id=944 bgcolor=#d6d6d6
| 157944 ||  || — || January 3, 2000 || Socorro || LINEAR || — || align=right | 5.4 km || 
|-id=945 bgcolor=#fefefe
| 157945 ||  || — || January 6, 2000 || Socorro || LINEAR || PHO || align=right | 2.9 km || 
|-id=946 bgcolor=#d6d6d6
| 157946 ||  || — || January 5, 2000 || Socorro || LINEAR || — || align=right | 5.7 km || 
|-id=947 bgcolor=#d6d6d6
| 157947 ||  || — || January 3, 2000 || Socorro || LINEAR || — || align=right | 5.6 km || 
|-id=948 bgcolor=#fefefe
| 157948 ||  || — || January 4, 2000 || Kitt Peak || Spacewatch || — || align=right | 1.2 km || 
|-id=949 bgcolor=#d6d6d6
| 157949 ||  || — || January 29, 2000 || Kitt Peak || Spacewatch || — || align=right | 4.2 km || 
|-id=950 bgcolor=#d6d6d6
| 157950 ||  || — || February 3, 2000 || Višnjan Observatory || K. Korlević || — || align=right | 5.4 km || 
|-id=951 bgcolor=#d6d6d6
| 157951 ||  || — || February 7, 2000 || Kitt Peak || Spacewatch || — || align=right | 3.8 km || 
|-id=952 bgcolor=#d6d6d6
| 157952 ||  || — || February 7, 2000 || Kitt Peak || Spacewatch || URS || align=right | 7.7 km || 
|-id=953 bgcolor=#d6d6d6
| 157953 ||  || — || February 3, 2000 || Kitt Peak || Spacewatch || — || align=right | 6.1 km || 
|-id=954 bgcolor=#fefefe
| 157954 ||  || — || February 26, 2000 || Kitt Peak || Spacewatch || — || align=right data-sort-value="0.97" | 970 m || 
|-id=955 bgcolor=#fefefe
| 157955 ||  || — || February 29, 2000 || Socorro || LINEAR || — || align=right | 1.3 km || 
|-id=956 bgcolor=#fefefe
| 157956 ||  || — || February 29, 2000 || Socorro || LINEAR || — || align=right | 1.0 km || 
|-id=957 bgcolor=#fefefe
| 157957 ||  || — || February 29, 2000 || Socorro || LINEAR || — || align=right | 1.7 km || 
|-id=958 bgcolor=#fefefe
| 157958 ||  || — || February 29, 2000 || Socorro || LINEAR || FLO || align=right | 1.1 km || 
|-id=959 bgcolor=#d6d6d6
| 157959 ||  || — || February 27, 2000 || Kitt Peak || Spacewatch || — || align=right | 4.6 km || 
|-id=960 bgcolor=#fefefe
| 157960 ||  || — || March 8, 2000 || Kitt Peak || Spacewatch || — || align=right data-sort-value="0.94" | 940 m || 
|-id=961 bgcolor=#d6d6d6
| 157961 ||  || — || March 5, 2000 || Socorro || LINEAR || — || align=right | 4.9 km || 
|-id=962 bgcolor=#fefefe
| 157962 ||  || — || March 11, 2000 || Socorro || LINEAR || — || align=right | 1.1 km || 
|-id=963 bgcolor=#fefefe
| 157963 ||  || — || March 11, 2000 || Anderson Mesa || LONEOS || — || align=right | 1.9 km || 
|-id=964 bgcolor=#fefefe
| 157964 ||  || — || March 11, 2000 || Anderson Mesa || LONEOS || FLO || align=right | 1.2 km || 
|-id=965 bgcolor=#fefefe
| 157965 ||  || — || March 26, 2000 || Anderson Mesa || LONEOS || V || align=right | 1.2 km || 
|-id=966 bgcolor=#fefefe
| 157966 ||  || — || April 6, 2000 || Prescott || P. G. Comba || — || align=right data-sort-value="0.94" | 940 m || 
|-id=967 bgcolor=#fefefe
| 157967 ||  || — || April 5, 2000 || Socorro || LINEAR || — || align=right | 1.0 km || 
|-id=968 bgcolor=#fefefe
| 157968 ||  || — || April 5, 2000 || Socorro || LINEAR || — || align=right | 1.1 km || 
|-id=969 bgcolor=#fefefe
| 157969 ||  || — || April 5, 2000 || Socorro || LINEAR || NYS || align=right data-sort-value="0.99" | 990 m || 
|-id=970 bgcolor=#fefefe
| 157970 ||  || — || April 5, 2000 || Socorro || LINEAR || — || align=right | 1.4 km || 
|-id=971 bgcolor=#fefefe
| 157971 ||  || — || April 5, 2000 || Socorro || LINEAR || — || align=right | 1.0 km || 
|-id=972 bgcolor=#fefefe
| 157972 ||  || — || April 5, 2000 || Socorro || LINEAR || — || align=right | 1.2 km || 
|-id=973 bgcolor=#fefefe
| 157973 ||  || — || April 6, 2000 || Socorro || LINEAR || FLO || align=right | 1.2 km || 
|-id=974 bgcolor=#fefefe
| 157974 ||  || — || April 4, 2000 || Socorro || LINEAR || — || align=right | 1.1 km || 
|-id=975 bgcolor=#fefefe
| 157975 ||  || — || April 4, 2000 || Anderson Mesa || LONEOS || FLO || align=right data-sort-value="0.96" | 960 m || 
|-id=976 bgcolor=#fefefe
| 157976 ||  || — || April 24, 2000 || Kitt Peak || Spacewatch || FLO || align=right | 1.1 km || 
|-id=977 bgcolor=#fefefe
| 157977 ||  || — || April 24, 2000 || Kitt Peak || Spacewatch || — || align=right | 2.1 km || 
|-id=978 bgcolor=#fefefe
| 157978 ||  || — || April 24, 2000 || Anderson Mesa || LONEOS || — || align=right | 1.3 km || 
|-id=979 bgcolor=#fefefe
| 157979 ||  || — || April 28, 2000 || Socorro || LINEAR || PHO || align=right | 1.8 km || 
|-id=980 bgcolor=#fefefe
| 157980 ||  || — || April 25, 2000 || Anderson Mesa || LONEOS || — || align=right | 1.1 km || 
|-id=981 bgcolor=#fefefe
| 157981 ||  || — || April 26, 2000 || Anderson Mesa || LONEOS || — || align=right | 1.3 km || 
|-id=982 bgcolor=#fefefe
| 157982 ||  || — || April 29, 2000 || Socorro || LINEAR || — || align=right | 2.2 km || 
|-id=983 bgcolor=#fefefe
| 157983 ||  || — || April 28, 2000 || Anderson Mesa || LONEOS || FLO || align=right | 1.6 km || 
|-id=984 bgcolor=#fefefe
| 157984 ||  || — || May 1, 2000 || Socorro || LINEAR || FLO || align=right | 1.0 km || 
|-id=985 bgcolor=#fefefe
| 157985 ||  || — || May 7, 2000 || Socorro || LINEAR || — || align=right | 1.2 km || 
|-id=986 bgcolor=#fefefe
| 157986 ||  || — || May 27, 2000 || Socorro || LINEAR || — || align=right | 1.4 km || 
|-id=987 bgcolor=#fefefe
| 157987 ||  || — || May 28, 2000 || Socorro || LINEAR || — || align=right | 1.1 km || 
|-id=988 bgcolor=#fefefe
| 157988 ||  || — || May 28, 2000 || Socorro || LINEAR || FLO || align=right | 1.1 km || 
|-id=989 bgcolor=#fefefe
| 157989 ||  || — || May 28, 2000 || Socorro || LINEAR || — || align=right | 1.7 km || 
|-id=990 bgcolor=#fefefe
| 157990 ||  || — || May 28, 2000 || Socorro || LINEAR || — || align=right | 1.2 km || 
|-id=991 bgcolor=#fefefe
| 157991 ||  || — || May 25, 2000 || Kitt Peak || Spacewatch || — || align=right | 1.3 km || 
|-id=992 bgcolor=#fefefe
| 157992 ||  || — || May 24, 2000 || Anderson Mesa || LONEOS || FLO || align=right data-sort-value="0.93" | 930 m || 
|-id=993 bgcolor=#fefefe
| 157993 ||  || — || June 3, 2000 || Ondřejov || P. Pravec, P. Kušnirák || — || align=right | 1.1 km || 
|-id=994 bgcolor=#fefefe
| 157994 ||  || — || June 4, 2000 || Kitt Peak || Spacewatch || — || align=right | 1.6 km || 
|-id=995 bgcolor=#FA8072
| 157995 ||  || — || June 1, 2000 || Socorro || LINEAR || — || align=right | 2.2 km || 
|-id=996 bgcolor=#fefefe
| 157996 ||  || — || June 5, 2000 || Anderson Mesa || LONEOS || — || align=right | 1.3 km || 
|-id=997 bgcolor=#d6d6d6
| 157997 ||  || — || June 5, 2000 || Anderson Mesa || LONEOS || 3:2 || align=right | 11 km || 
|-id=998 bgcolor=#fefefe
| 157998 ||  || — || July 23, 2000 || Socorro || LINEAR || — || align=right | 1.6 km || 
|-id=999 bgcolor=#d6d6d6
| 157999 ||  || — || July 30, 2000 || Prescott || P. G. Comba || 3:2 || align=right | 6.6 km || 
|-id=000 bgcolor=#d6d6d6
| 158000 ||  || — || July 30, 2000 || Socorro || LINEAR || HIL3:2 || align=right | 10 km || 
|}

References

External links 
 Discovery Circumstances: Numbered Minor Planets (155001)–(160000) (IAU Minor Planet Center)

0157